= List of instruments used in ophthalmology =

This is a list of instruments used in ophthalmology.

== Instrument list ==
A complete list of ophthalmic instruments can be found below:

== Classification ==
This list is grouped into: diagnostic instruments; imaging devices; functional tests; biometry/measurement tools

== Diagnostic instruments ==
Instrument	Uses	Typical setting	Related articles	Source(s)
Slit lamp	Binocular biomicroscope for anterior segment; with lenses for posterior segment.	Clinic	Gonioscopy, Ophthalmoscopy	
Direct ophthalmoscope	Upright, magnified central fundus view (ONH, macula).	Clinic, bedside	Fundus photography	
Binocular indirect ophthalmoscope	Wide-field peripheral retina exam with condensing lens.	Clinic, OR	Retinal detachment	
Gonioscopy lens	Visualizes anterior chamber angle structures.	Clinic	Glaucoma	
Retinoscope	Objective refraction via retinal reflex.	Clinic, screening	Refraction	
Phoropter / trial lens set	Subjective refraction and binocular testing.	Clinic	Astigmatism, Accommodation	

== Imaging devices ==
Instrument	Purpose / typical use (1 line)	Typical setting	Related articles	Source(s)
Fundus camera	Color images of retina/optic nerve for documentation & screening.	Clinic, screening	Diabetic retinopathy	
OCT / OCT-A	Cross-sectional retinal/optic nerve imaging; non-invasive flow maps.	Clinic	Macular degeneration	
Fluorescein angiography / ICG system	Retinal/choroidal angiography with IV dye.	Clinic	Retinal vein occlusion	
B-scan ocular ultrasound	Posterior segment imaging when media are opaque.	Clinic, theatre	Vitreous hemorrhage	
Corneal topography/tomography	Maps corneal curvature/elevation/pachymetry.	Clinic	Keratoconus	

== Unclassified List ==
Instrument	Uses
Toric Marker	to mark 0 to 180 degree reference mark for Toric IOL implant
Pre-chopper	to chop lens into pieces before implantation new lens and reduce phaco time
Spectacles (glasses)	to correct refractive errors of the eye; not invasive
Contact lenses	to correct refractive errors of the eye; a little invasive
Phoropter	used in refraction testing
Tonometers	used to determine the intraocular pressure (IOP) - useful in glaucoma; video link for various types of tonometers.
Speculum:	to keep the eyes open during any operation
Universal eye speculum	-do-; heavy instrument and can not keep eyelashes out of the operating field
•Guarded eye speculum (left and right)	-do-; heavy instrument but can keep eyelashes out of the operating field with its "guard" and hence left or right ones are required
•Wire Speculum	to keep the eyes open during any operation; light wire instrument
Needle holders:	holding the needle in position while applying sutures
•Silcock's needle holder	-do-; has a catch and is used for heavier gauge needles; used mainly for skin, muscle and corneal incisions
•Arruga's needle holder	-do-; has a catch (lock) and is used for heavier gauge needles (thicker than 6–0); used mainly for skin, muscle and corneal incisions
•Barraquer's needle holder	-do-; small instrument with a spring action with or without a catch used for finer gauge needles (5-0 or finer); used mainly for intraoccular incisions
Forceps:	to hold anything
•Artery forceps (haemostat)	medium-sized, with a serrated tip and a catch; used to hold bleeding vessels and compress them in order to make them stop bleeding and also to hold or crush structures.
•Fixation forceps	has a few teeth at the tip; for holding structures and restricting their movement or to hold small swabs
•Plain dissecting forceps	blunt untoothed with a serrated tip; for holding structures and restricting their movement or to hold small swabs
•Iris forceps	fine tipped (straight or otherwise) with small teeth; to hold the iris tissue during procedures
•Elschnig's intracapsular forceps	fine untoothed forceps for holding tissue, swabs, sutures, etc.; removing things like clots, capsule fragments, lens, etc.; used in cataract surgery
•Arruga's intracapsular forceps	fine untoothed forceps holding tissue, swabs, sutures, etc.; removing things like clots, capsule fragments, lens, etc.; used in cataract surgery
•Colibri forceps	fine toothed forceps for holding flaps of cornea or sclera and rarely the iris
•Saint Martin's forceps	holding flaps of cornea or sclera and rarely the iris
•Superior rectus holding forceps	specially curved (to fit into the orbit of the eye) forceps for catching hold of the muscle bellies of the intraorbital muscles and sutures
•Suture tier forceps	fine limbed untoothed forceps to hold fine sutures or hairs
•Capsulotomy forceps	to tear the anterior capsule of the lens during cataract surgery
•Disc holding forceps	used in glaucoma surgery (obsolete)
•Capsulorhexis forceps	fine sharp-tipped untoothed forceps for doing a continuous curvilinear incision and removal of the anterior capsule of the lens ("continuous curvilinear capsulorhexis - ccc")
•MacPherson's forceps	fine sharp-tipped untoothed forceps with an angulation for holding parts of the lens, the intraocular lens, 10-0 (very fine) sutures, etc.
•Chalazion forceps (clamp)	self-retaining with discoid ends; used to hold and prevent a chalazion from bleeding during its surgery
Diamond knife	used to perform microincisions on the cornea in the Radial keratotomy and Mini Asymmetric Radial Keratotomy (M.A.R.K.)
•Epilation forceps (Cilia forceps)	stout flat-ended blunt forceps with a thickened end to remove eyelashes
•Entropion forceps	self-retaining with big discoid ends used to hold and prevent an entropion from bleeding during its surgery
Chalazion scoop	to remove the granulation tissue from a chalazion during surgery
Entropion clamp	right and left varieties exist; large clamp with two limbs; self-retaining with big discoid ends used to hold and prevent an entropion from bleeding during its surgery
Nettleship's punctum dilator	to dilate the lacrimal punctum of the lacrimal apparatus of the eye for syringing or operations
Cystotome	a 26 gauge needle bent twice used for incising the anterior capsule of the lens in lens extraction
Wire vectis	a loop of wire attached to a stack used to extract cataract affected lenses
Irrigating vectis	a small hollow instrument with a used to introduce fluid into the anterior chamber to raise its pressure to aid cataract extraction
Canula	used to carry fluid
•Irrigation-aspiration two-way canula	effectively two small canulae fitted together, one to introduce fluid and the other to extract the cortical materials, blood, etc. in eye operations
•Lacrimal canula	small curved canula the size of a syringe needle used to introduce fluids or drugs into the nasolacrimal passage to test its patency or during surgery (dacrocystography, dacrocystectomy, dacryocystorhinostomy(DCR), etc.
Lang's lacrimal dissector with scoop	for blunt dissections and cleaning during operations like dacryocystorhinostomy
Rougine	dissection of lacrimal sac
Retractor	to pull and hold overlying tissue out of the operating field
•Muller's self retaining adjustable haemostatic retractor	-do-; self retaining haemostatic
•Cat's paw retractor	-do-
•Desmarre's lid retractor	-do-; specially for noncooperative patients and to see the fornices (see human eye)
Bone punch	to fracture pieces from a thin bone in facial surgery and during operations like dacryocystorhinostomy
Evisceration spoon or scoop	removing all the contents of the eyeball during evisceration (complete removal of all structures within the eye in diseases like endophthalmitis
Lid plate	flat large instrument that has a groove and is placed between the lid and globe of the eye to provide a solid support for eyelid surgery
Hammer, chisel and bone gouge	bone cutting and shaping
Bowmen's discussion needle	microsurgery of the lens capsule
Knives	to cut structures
•Surgical scalpel with small blades	general purpose instrument
•von Graefe's cataract knife	cutting out of the anterior chamber from the inside through the limbus
•Tookes' knife (Sclero-corneal splitter)	making sclerocorneal tunnels in "small incision cataract surgery (SICS)" and keratoplasty
•Crescent knife (Sclero-corneal splitter)	making sclerocorneal tunnels in "small incision cataract surgery"
•Angular keratome	making sclerocorneal tunnels in "small incision cataract surgery"; larger one used to increase the size of the incision
•Side-port blade	making sclerocorneal "side port" (a secondary tunnel) tunnels in "small incision cataract surgery"
•Beer's knife	incise the conjunctiva or the eyelid skin
•Keratotome	small triangular blade with two sharp edges used to incise the limbus (sclerocorneal junction)
•Zeigler's knife	very tiny knife for intaoccular maneuvers specially when space is less
Scissors	-
•Conjunctival sac scissors	flat small curved scissors to cut the conjunctive
•Corneal spring scissors	medium spring-open used to cut the external side of the cornea, fine sutures; iris, etc.
•de' Wecker's iris scissors	small slender spring-open scissors for intraocular maneuvers (iris and deeper and more delicate structures); has two wings to operate it and one sharp and one blunt blade.
•Vannas' scissors	small slender spring-open scissors for intraocular maneuvers (iris and deeper and more delicate structures); has two wings to operate it and one sharp and one blunt blade.
•Enucleation scissors	thick scissors used to cut the optic nerve in enucleation operation
Bowman's lacrimal probe	probing the nasolacrimal duct
Lens expressor	used to force out the lens in extracapsular or intracapsular cataract extraction
McNamar's spoon	used to force out the lens in intracapsular cataract extraction
Iris repositor	two limbed instrument used to remove the iris during posterior chamber maneuvers
Sinsky's hook intraocular lens dialler	angulated round hook with a handle used in insertion of an intraocular lens
Strabismus hook	muscle hook or squint hook; sharp tip or knobbed tip; used in squint surgery
Foreign body spud and needle	Spud to remove superficial and needle for the deep foreign bodies in the eye
Elliot's trephine with handle	used in corneal donation (eye donation) to cut out the cornea in a circular fashion
Castroveijo's calipers	various measurements are taken
Castroveijo's corneal trephine	used in corneal donation (eye donation) to cut out the cornea in a circular fashion
Pin-hole	testing visual acuity
Red green goggles	(red - right side & green - left side) used in Worth 4 dot test, diplopia testing
Prisms	to measure the degree of squints; in other instruments; refractive correction; etc.
Placido's disc	to assess the condition of the corneal surface
Retinoscope	objective determination of refractive error and for looking inside the eye
Loupe	used to search for magnified examination of the anterior segment of the eye (uniocular or binocular)
Jackson's cross cylinder	used to check the power and axis of a cylindrical lens
Maddox rod	used to test for latent squint and retinal function
Refraction box	has lenses of different powers for refraction testing
Slit lamp bio microscope	used for examining the anteriorly placed structures the eye; video link
Charts for vision	-
•Distant vision	to determine visual acuity of distant vision
••Snellen's distant vision chart	-do-; for those who can read in English
••Regional language charts	-do-; for those who can read in their local language
••E Chart	-do-; for those who can not read
••Landolt's broken ring chart	-do-; for those who can not read
••Toys pr picture chart	-do-; for children
•Near vision	-do-; to determine visual acuity of near vision
••Jager's chart	-do-
••Printer's types of N series	-do-
••Snellen's near chart (1/17th reduction of distant chart)	-do-; standard chart of alphabets; video link
•Colour vision:	to test colour vision
••Ishihara's chart	to determine the type of colour blindness
Stenopaeic slit	detection of axis of the cylindrical (astigmatism) power of the eye; glaucoma testing
Implants	-
•Intraocular lens	prosthetic lenses implanted after lens (anatomy) removal
•Artificial eyes	as non-functional cosmetic implants into the eye socket
Blade breaker	to break disposable blade after use to prevent reuse
Thermo-cautery	to coagulate blood vessels and prevent haemorrhage
Cryoprobe	to freeze and extract the lens
Yttrium aluminium garnet laser (YAG laser)	to correct posterior capsular opacification (specially after removal of a cataract, if required), peripheral iridotomy, retinal surgery, laser-assisted sub-epithelial keratectomy (LASEK) etc.
Electrolysis	used for permanent hair removal
Electrocautery	for electrosurgery
Phacoemulsification	used for extraction of a cataract affected lens after emulsifying it using a high frequency (energy) ultrasound probe

== Image gallery ==
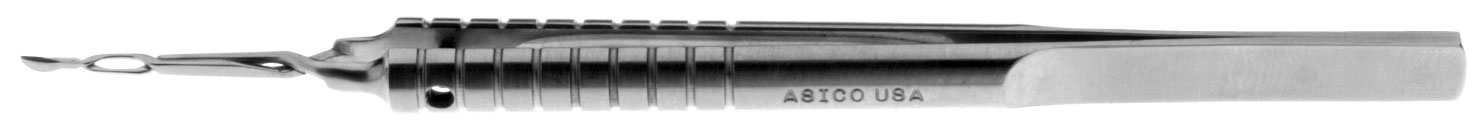
Akahoshi Combo II Prechopper

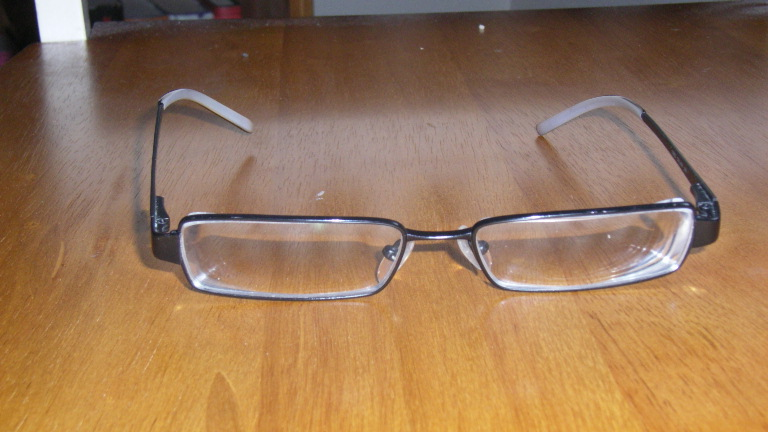
Glasses

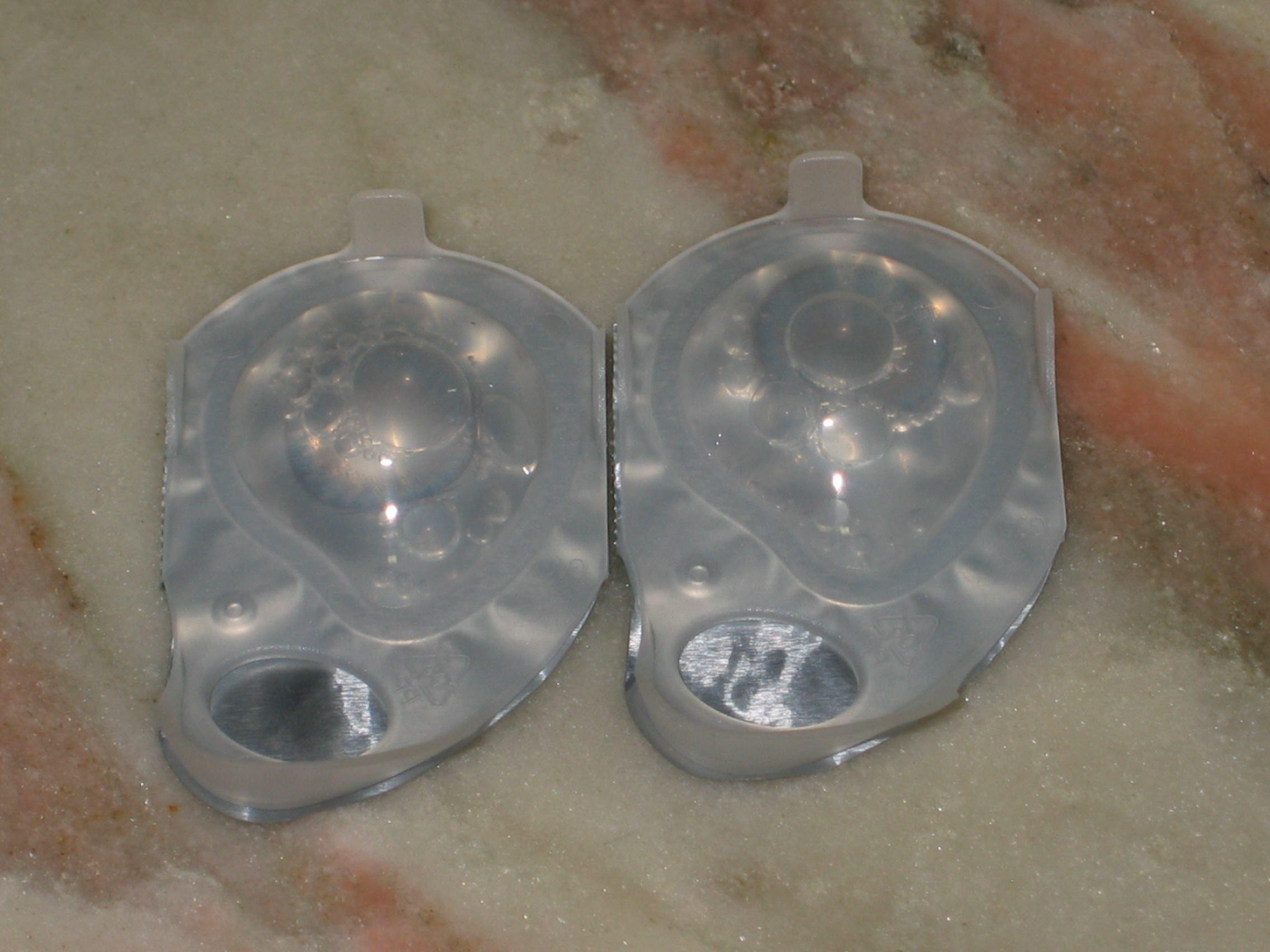
Contact lenses

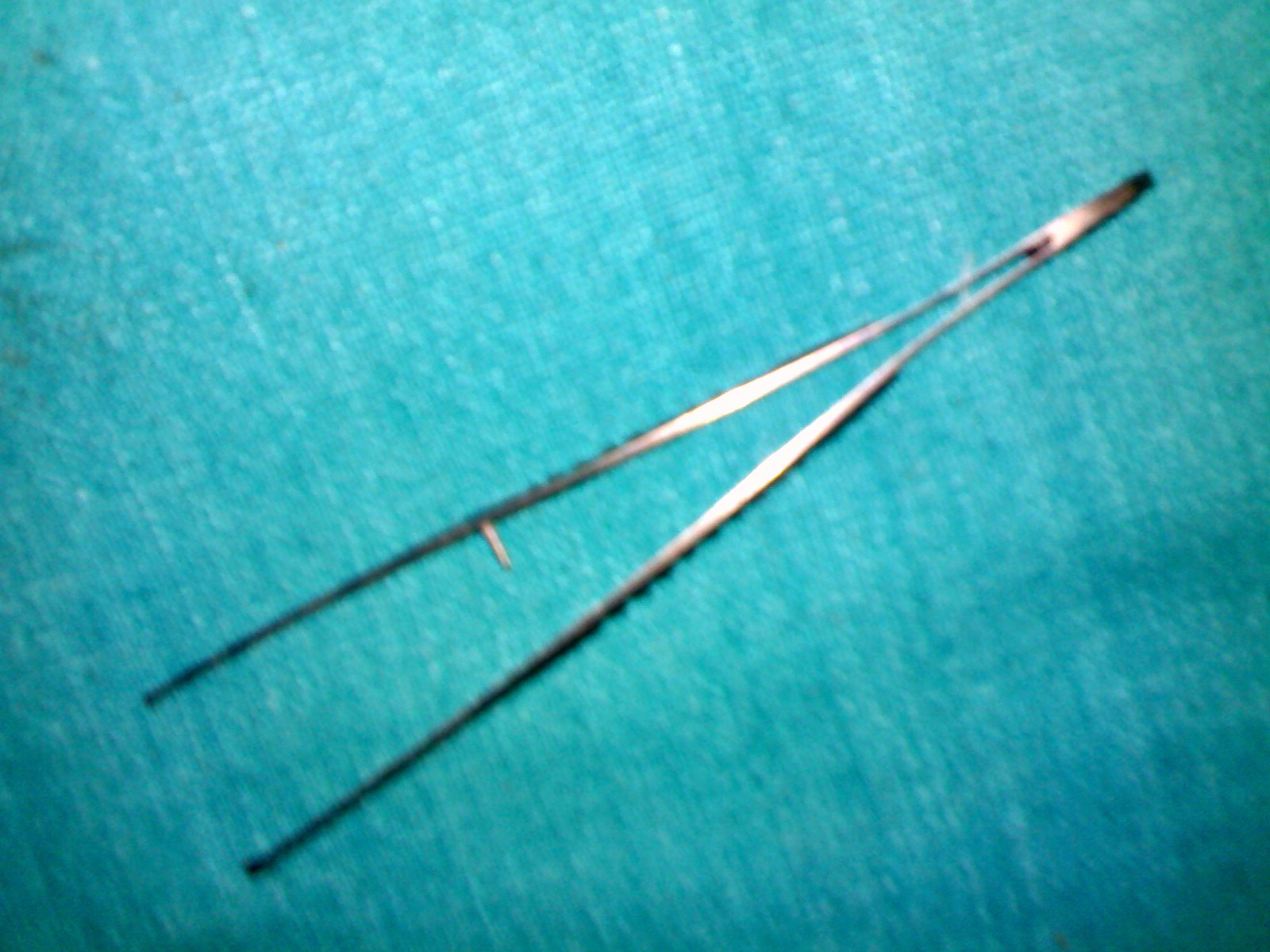
Plain dissecting forceps

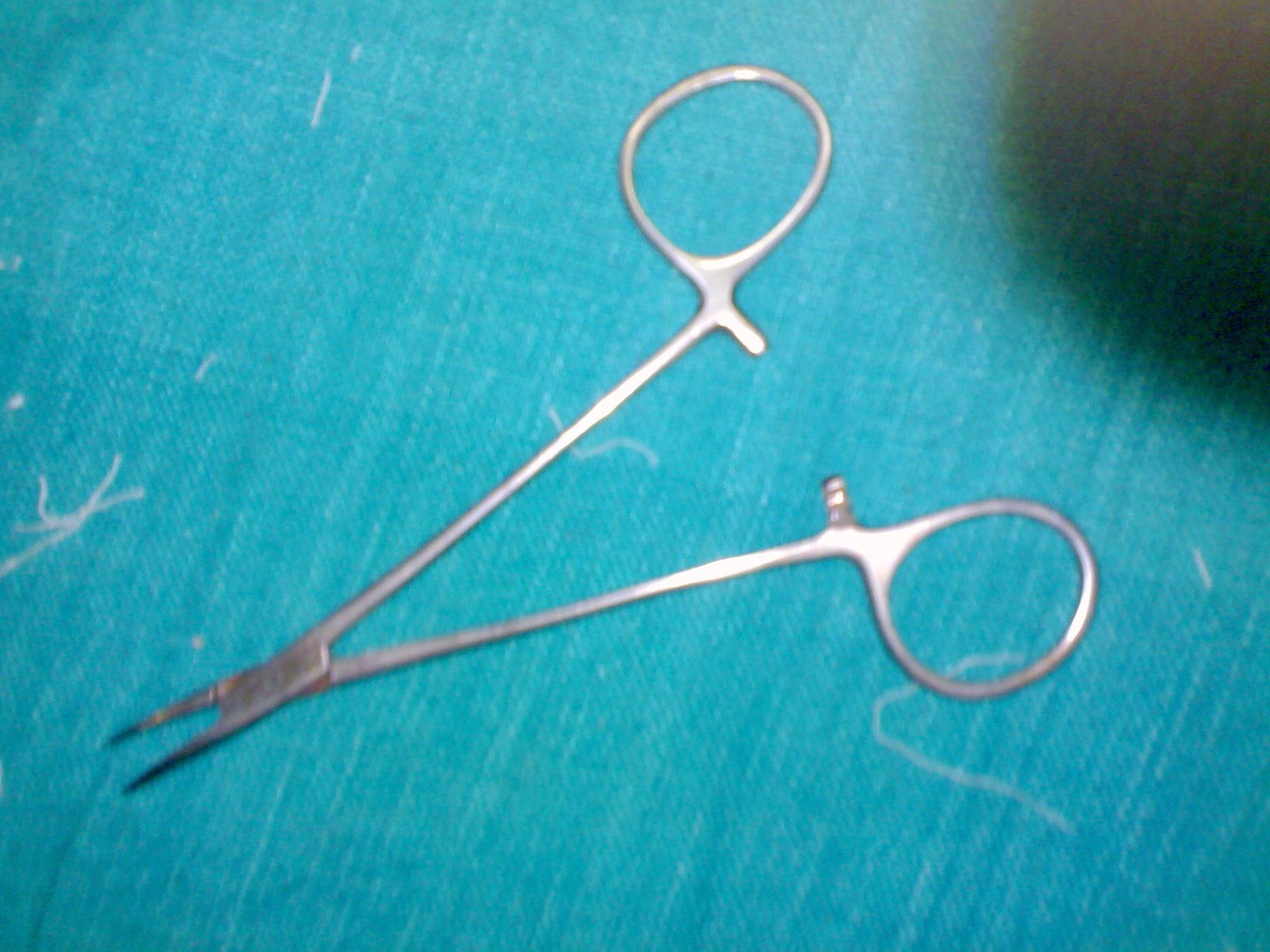
Artery forceps or Haemostat

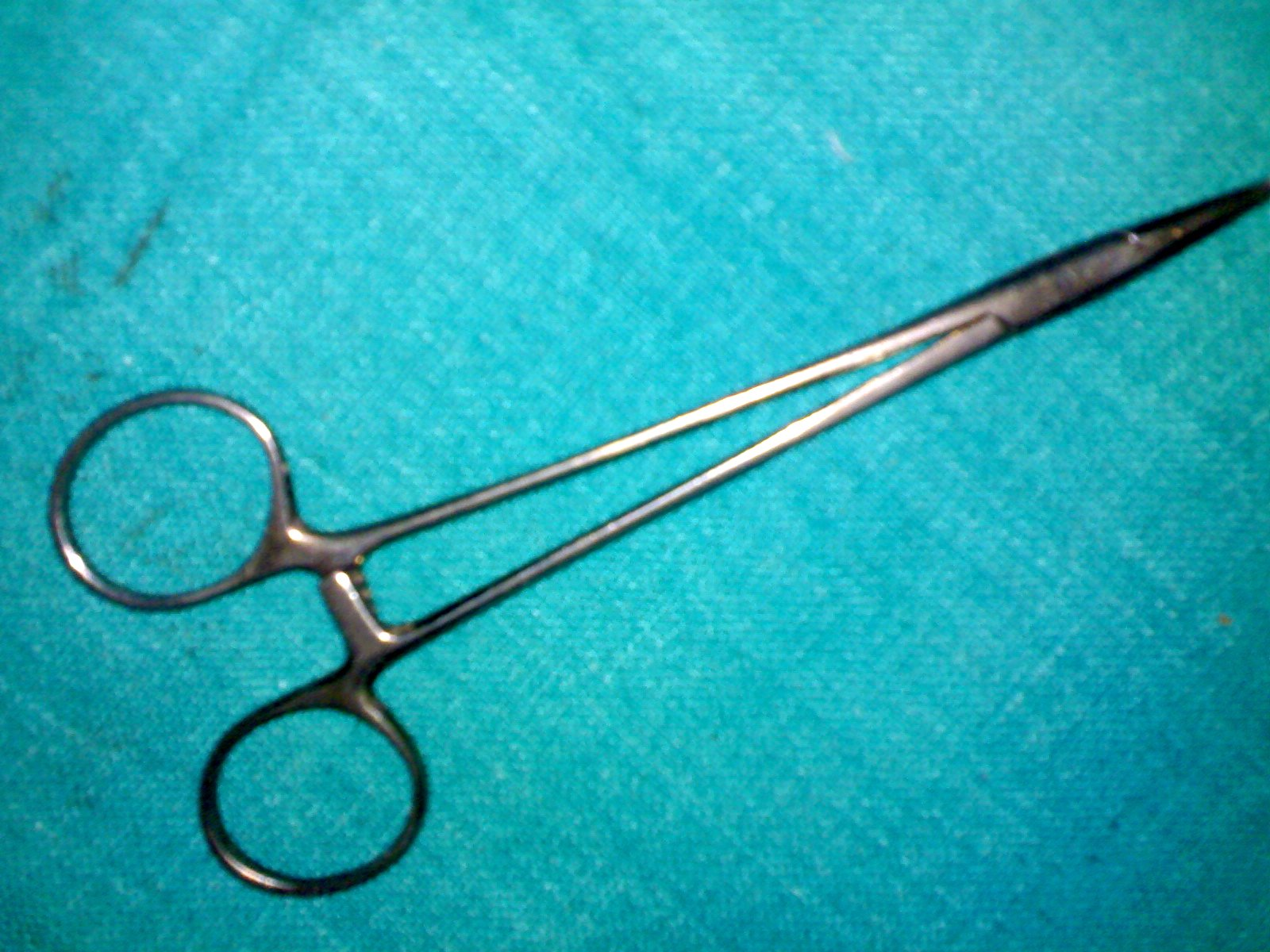
Mosquito forceps

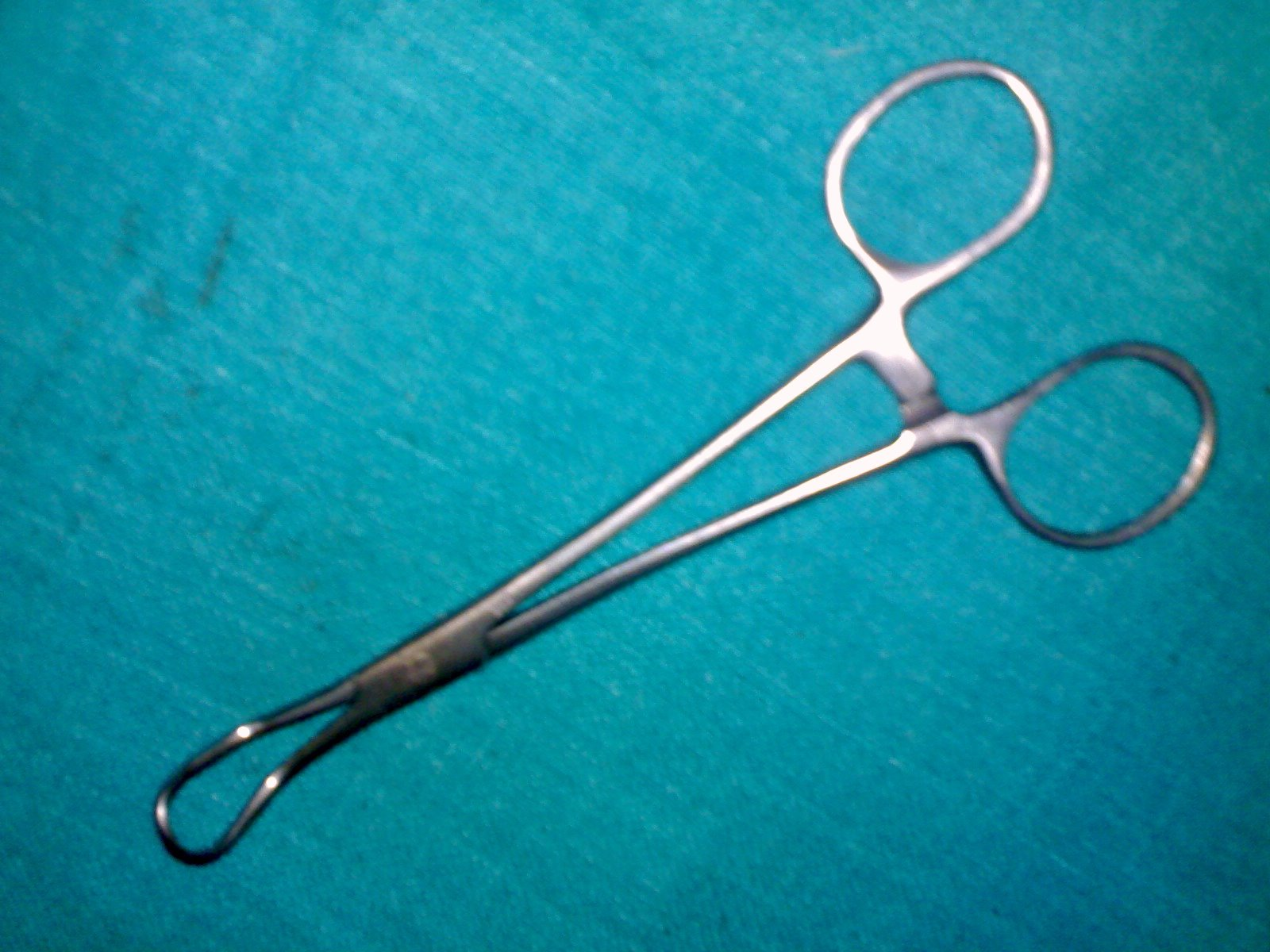
Linen holding forceps

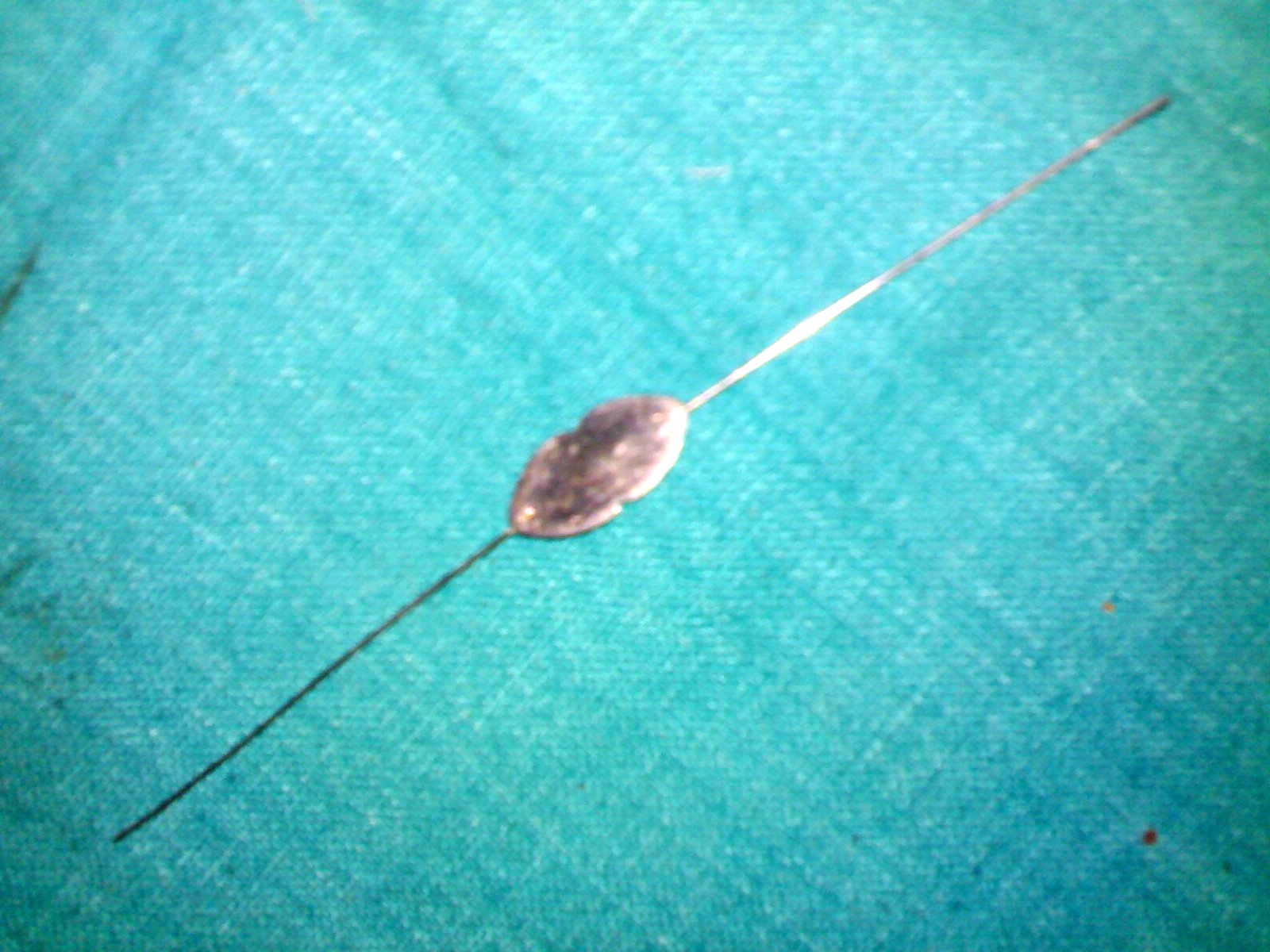
Bowman's lacrimal probe

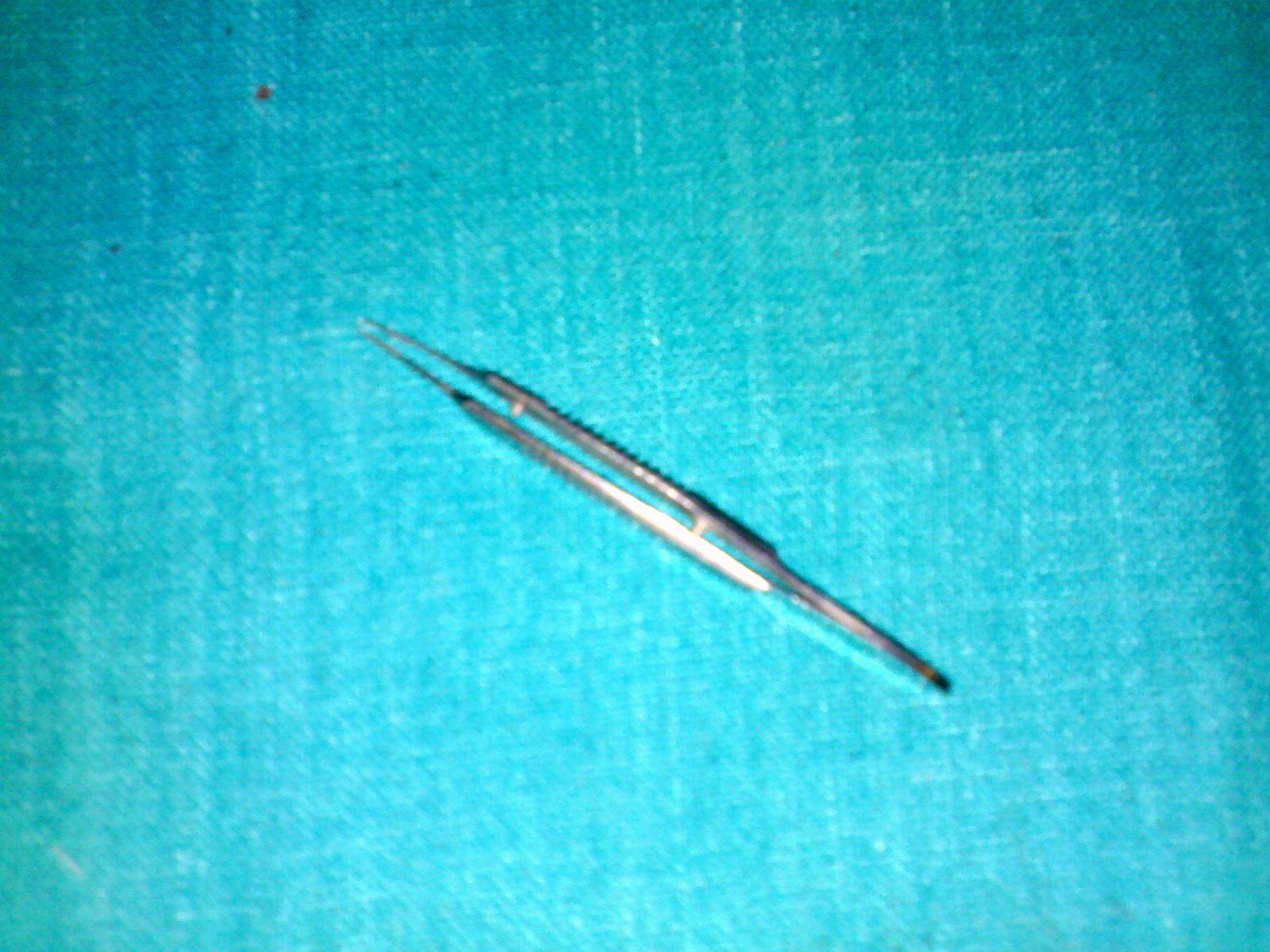
Saint Martin's forceps

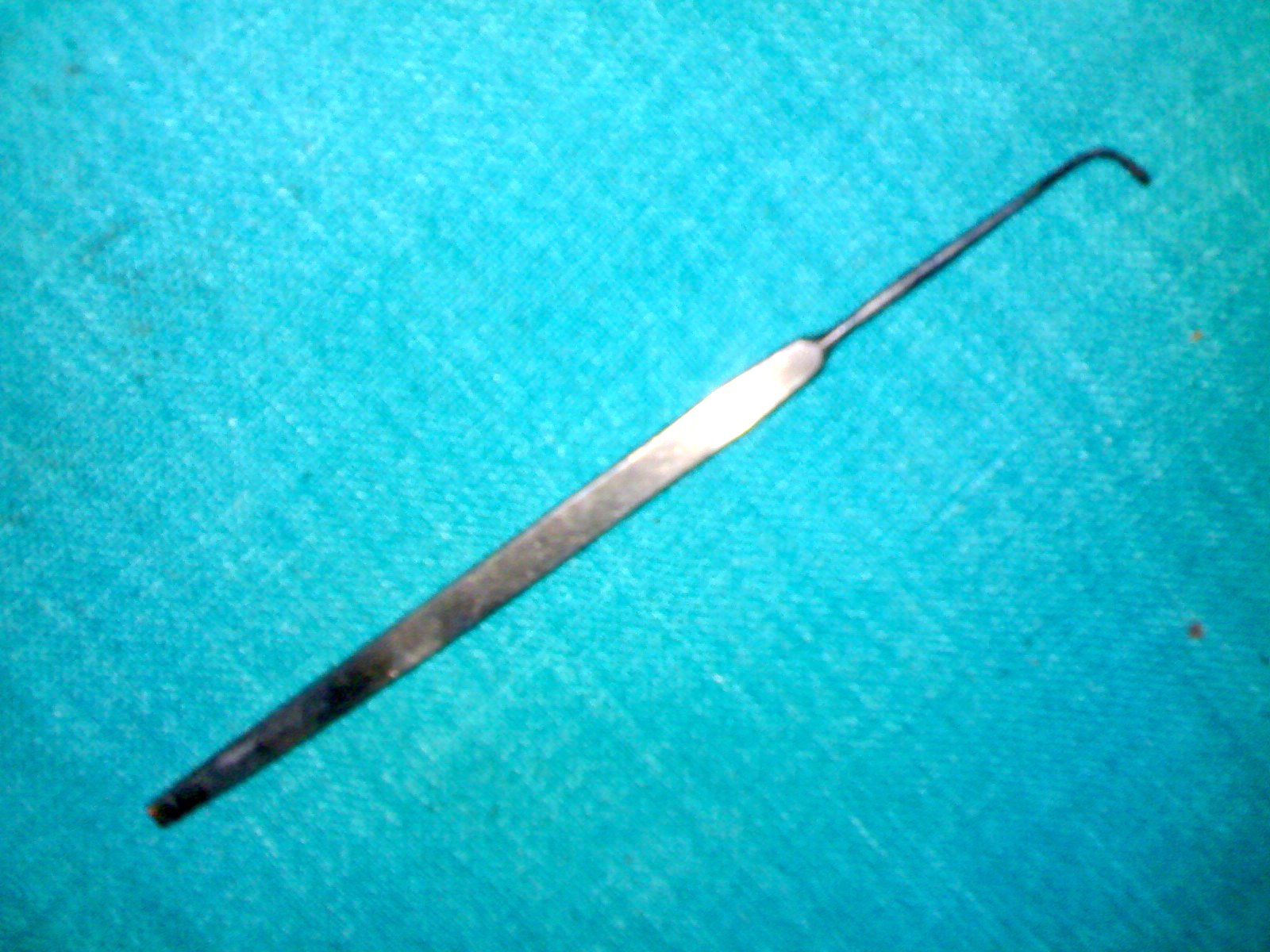
Eye Lens expressor

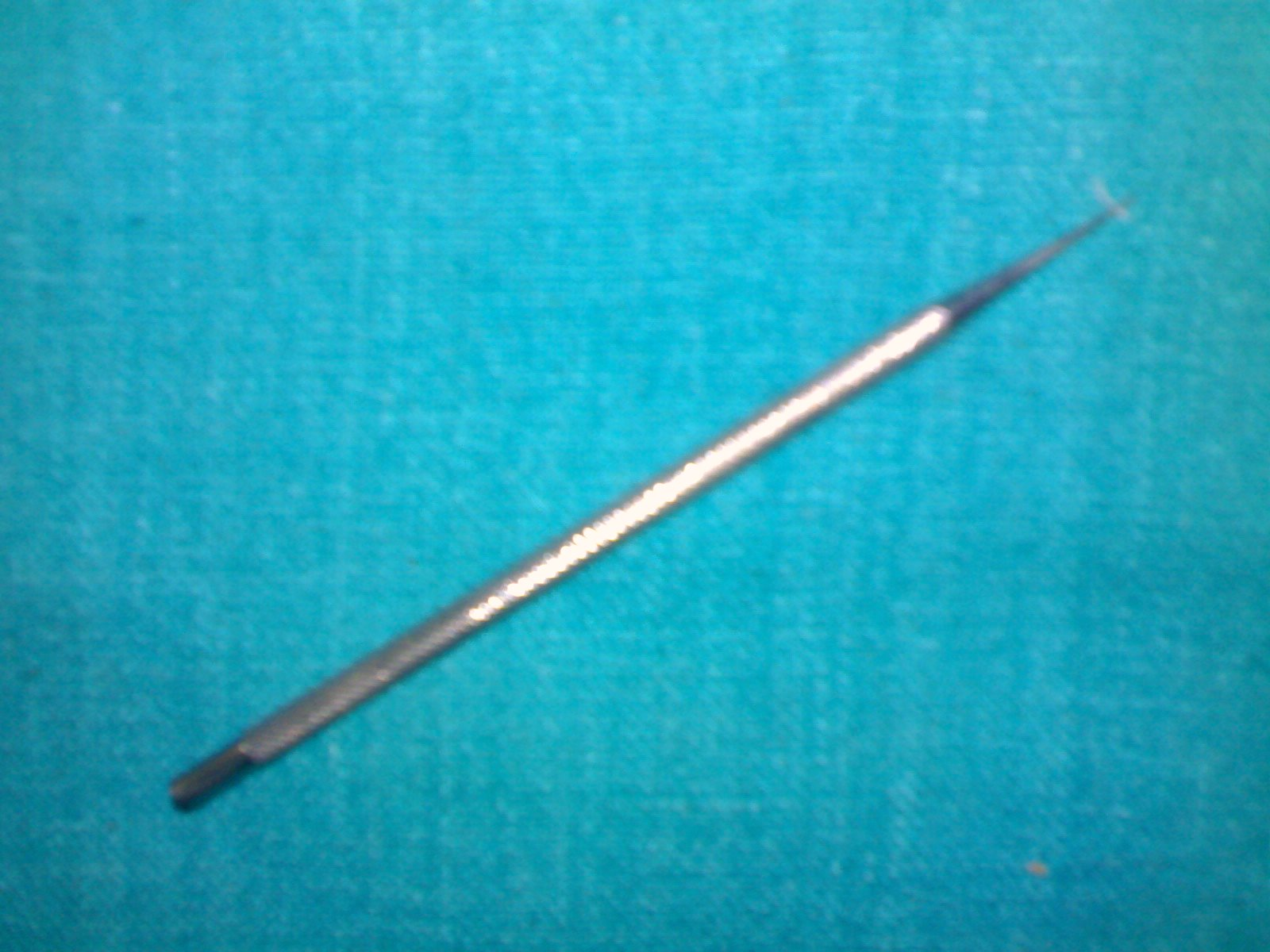
Nettleship's punctum dilator

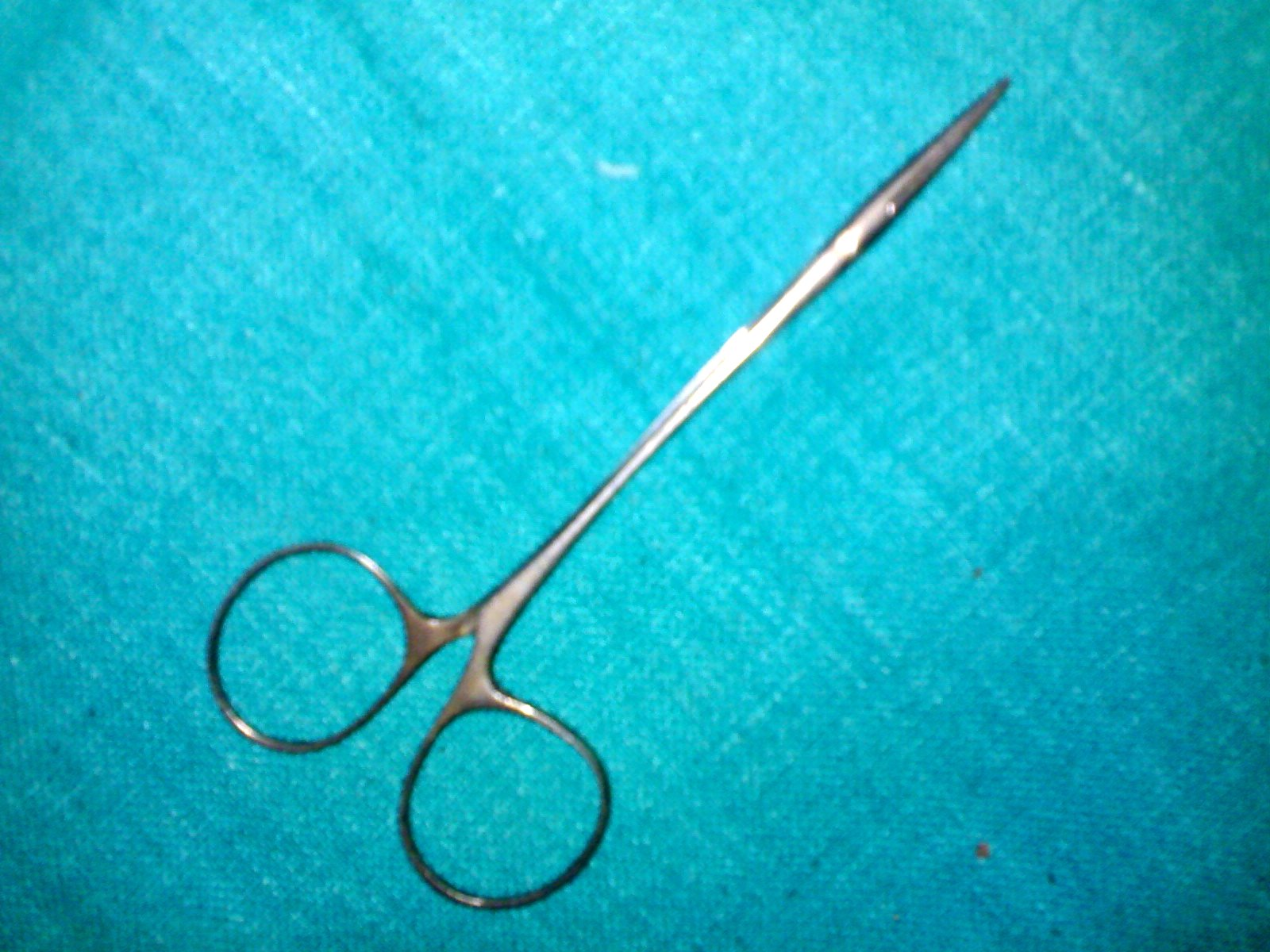
Small scissors

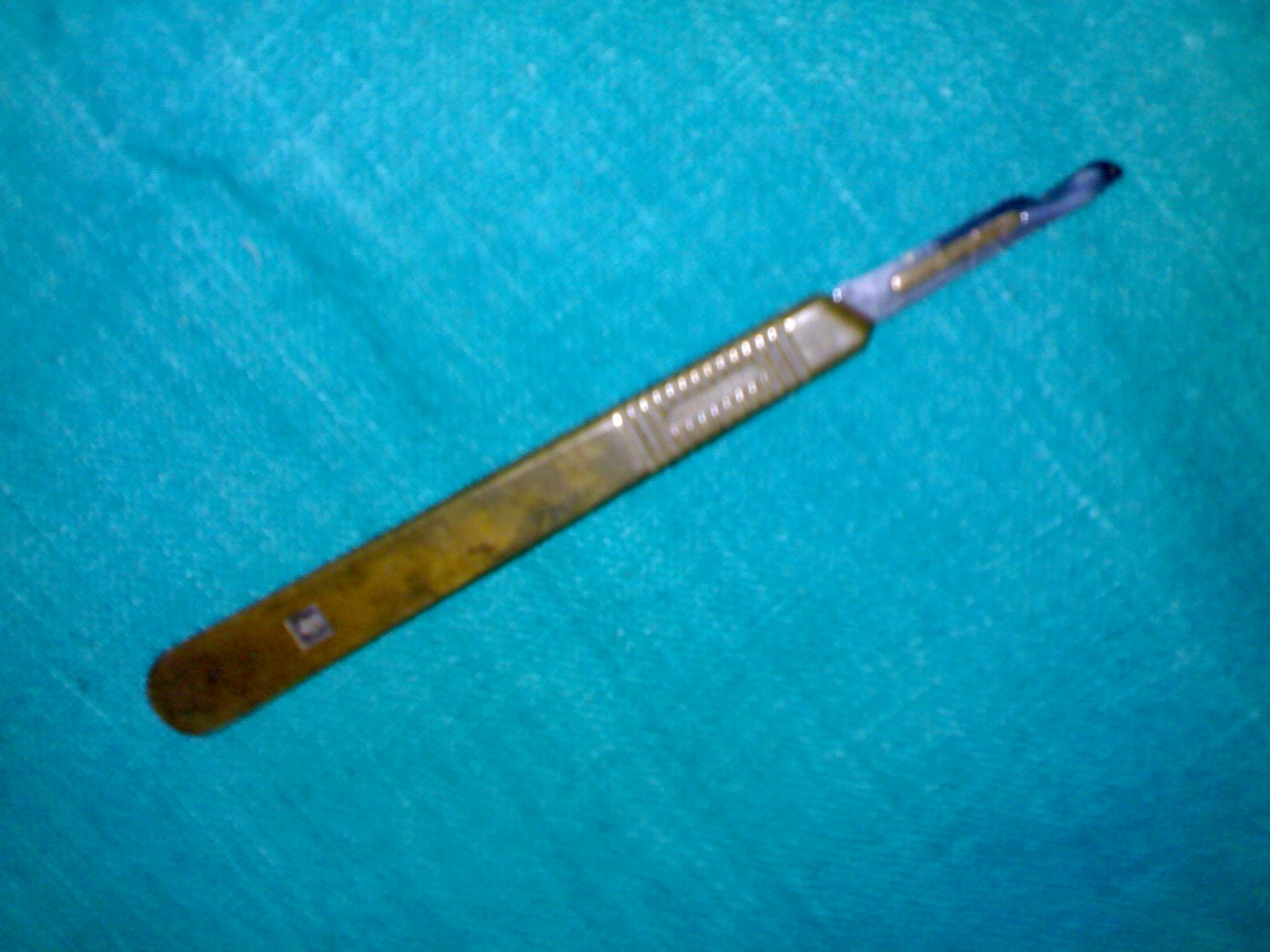
Scalpel with blade attached

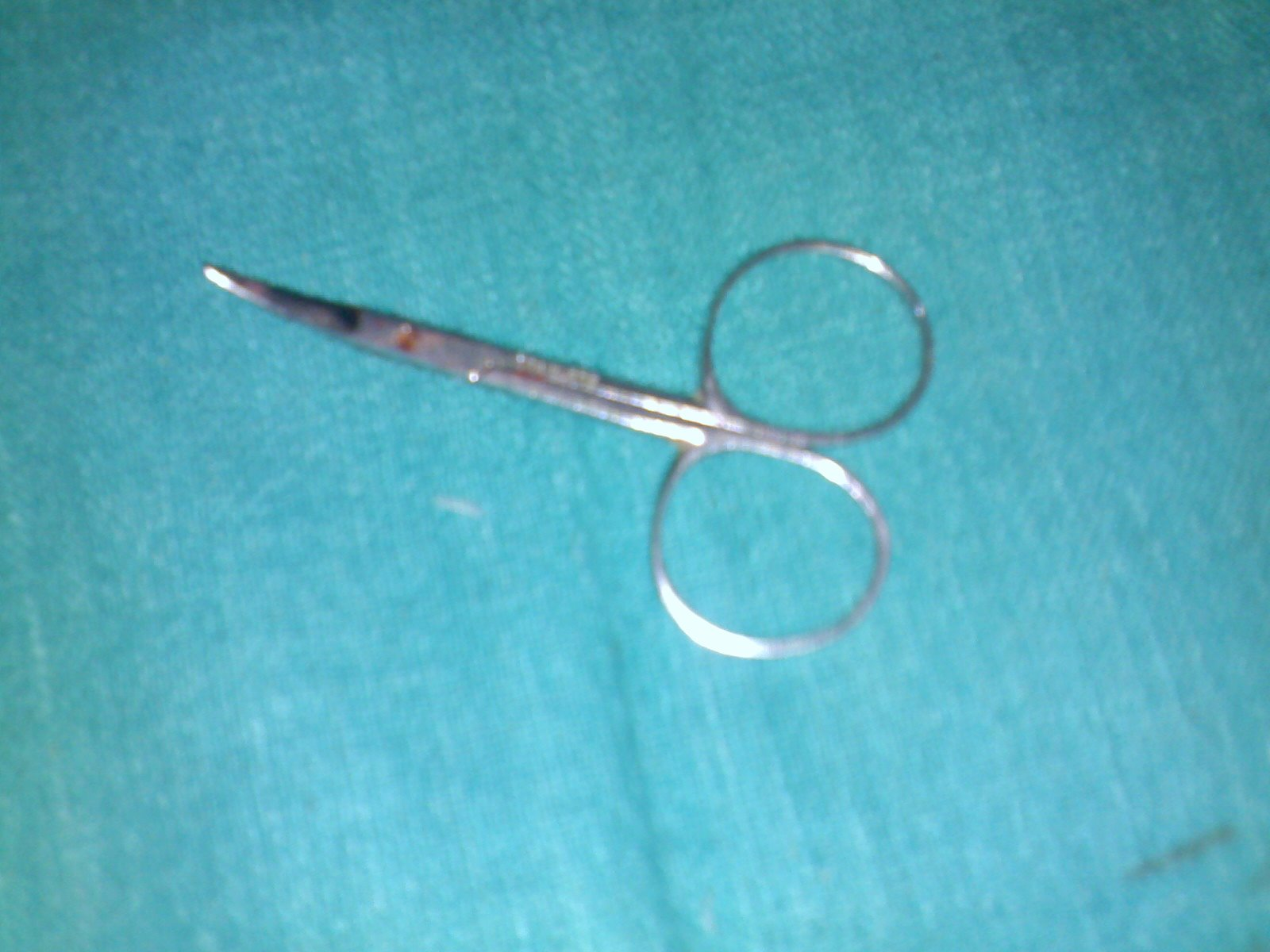
Conjunctival sac scissors

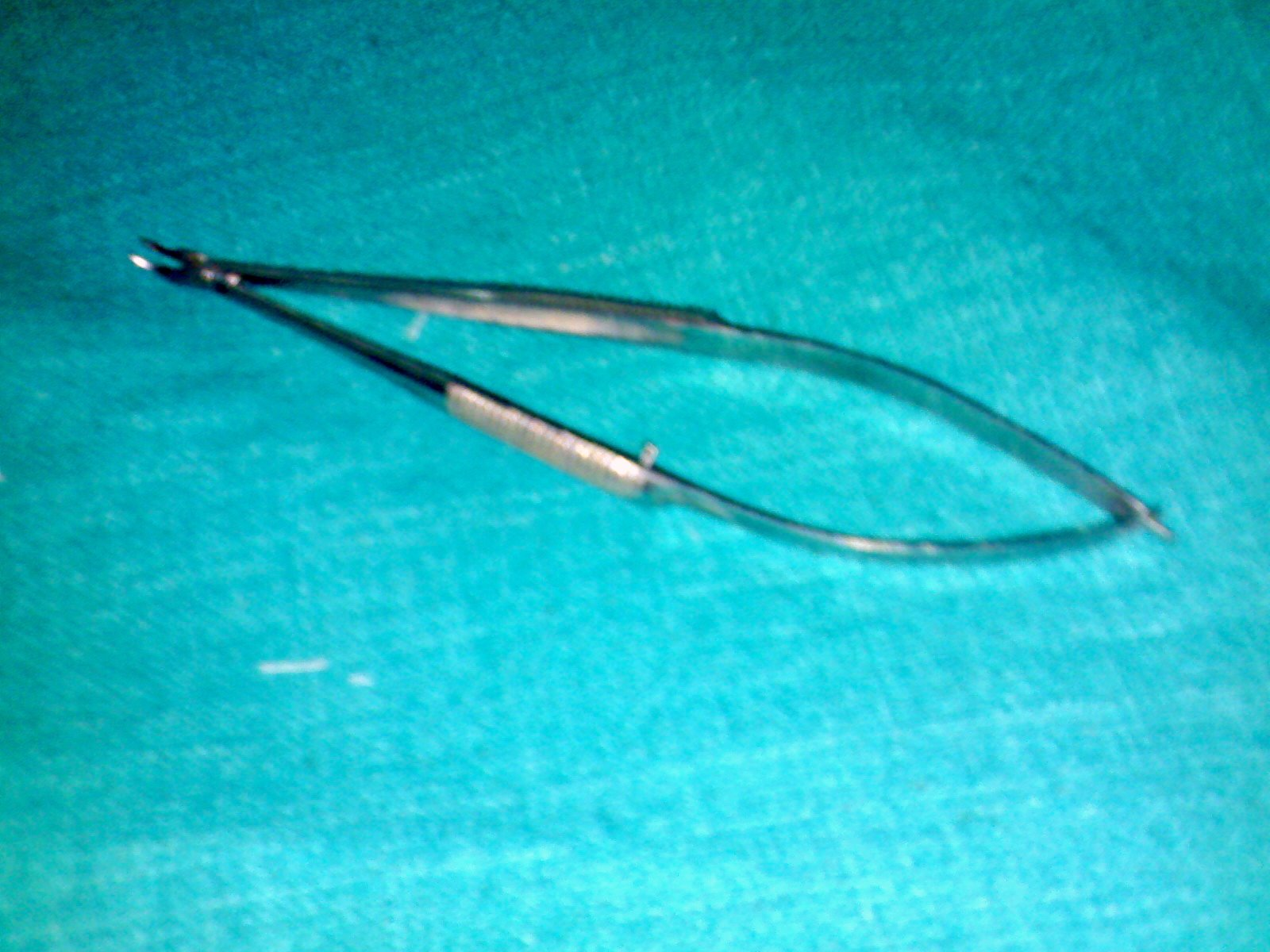
Barraquer's needle holder

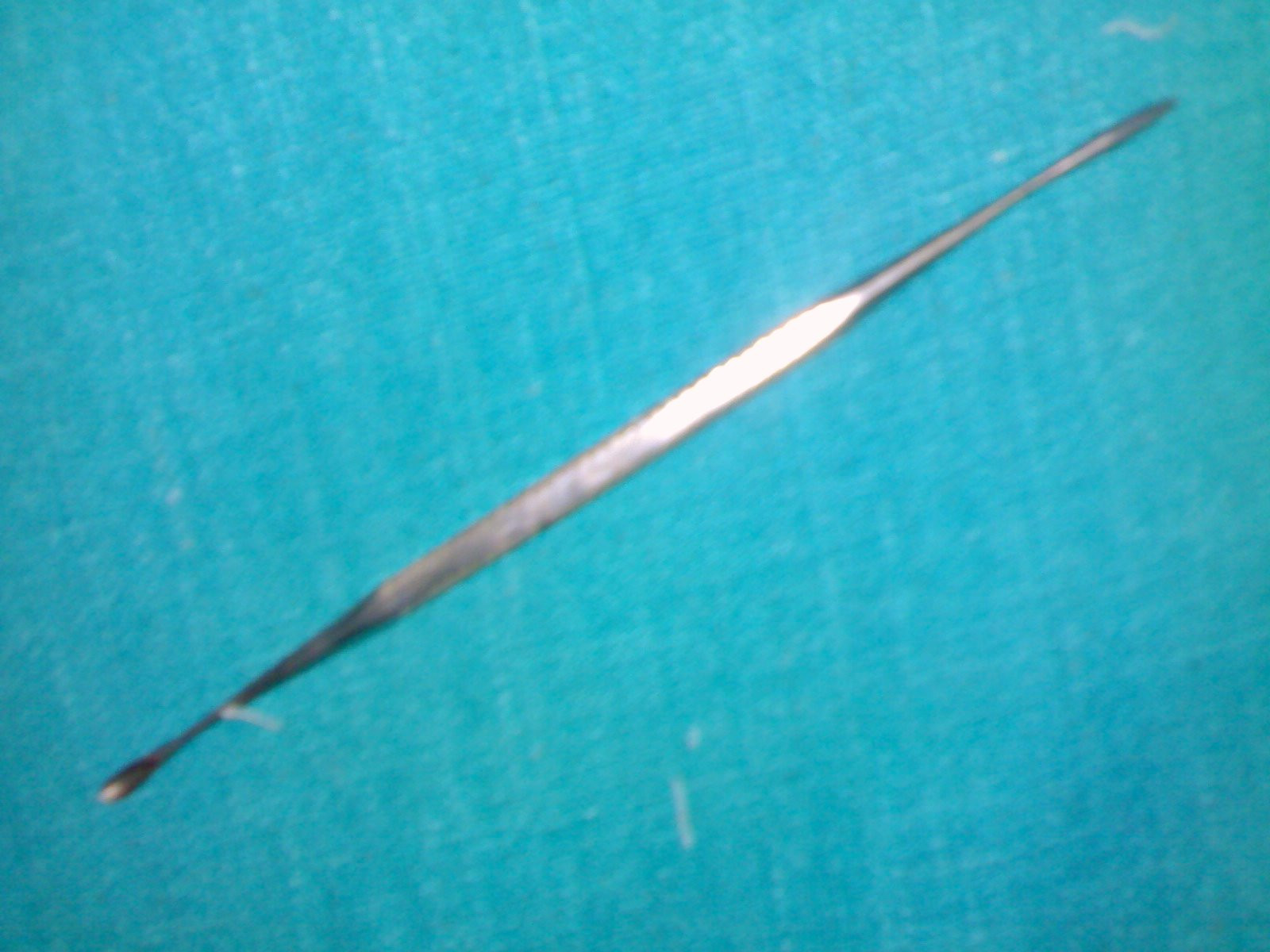
Lacrimal sac dilator with scoop

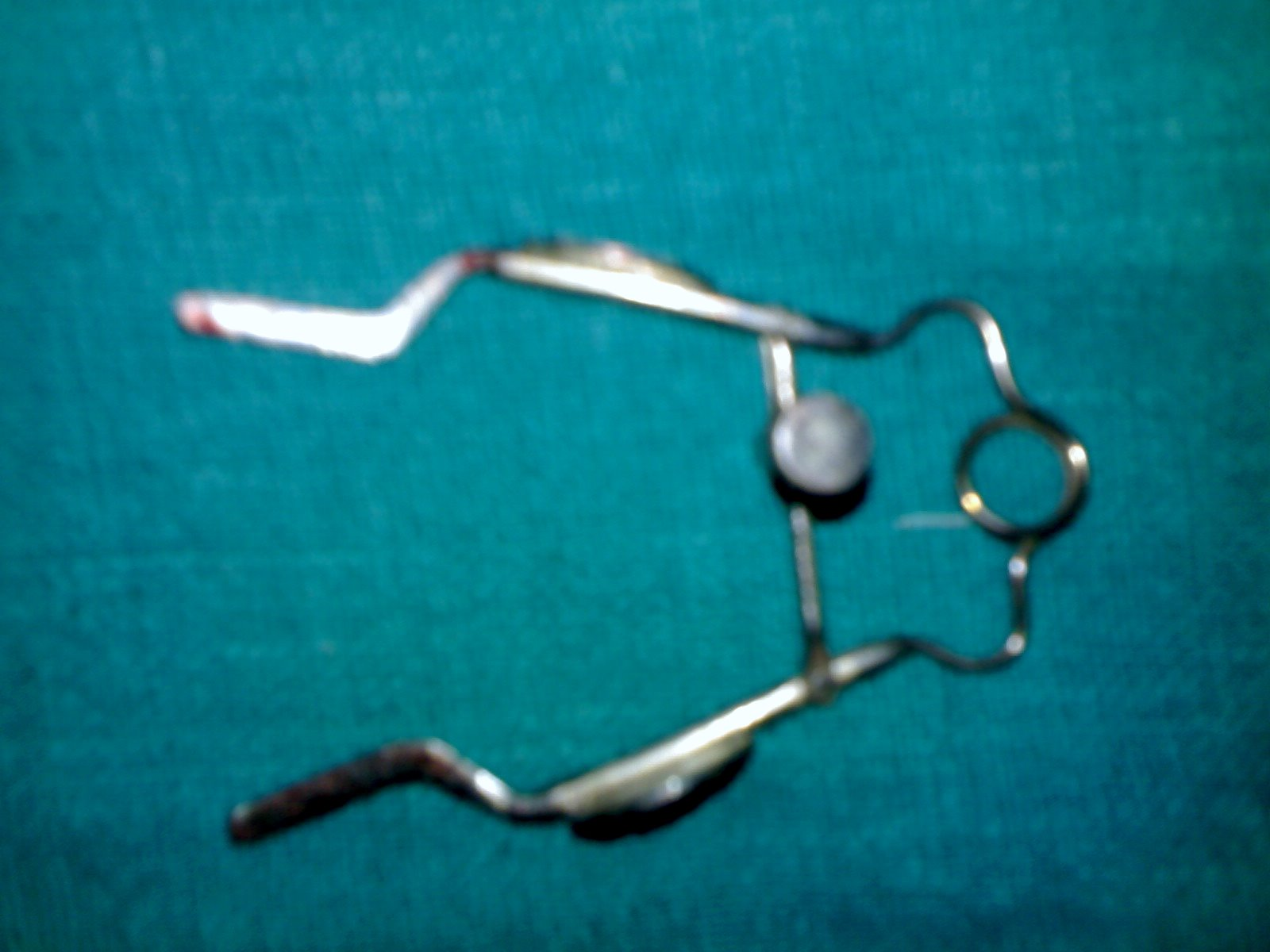
Muller's retractor, top view

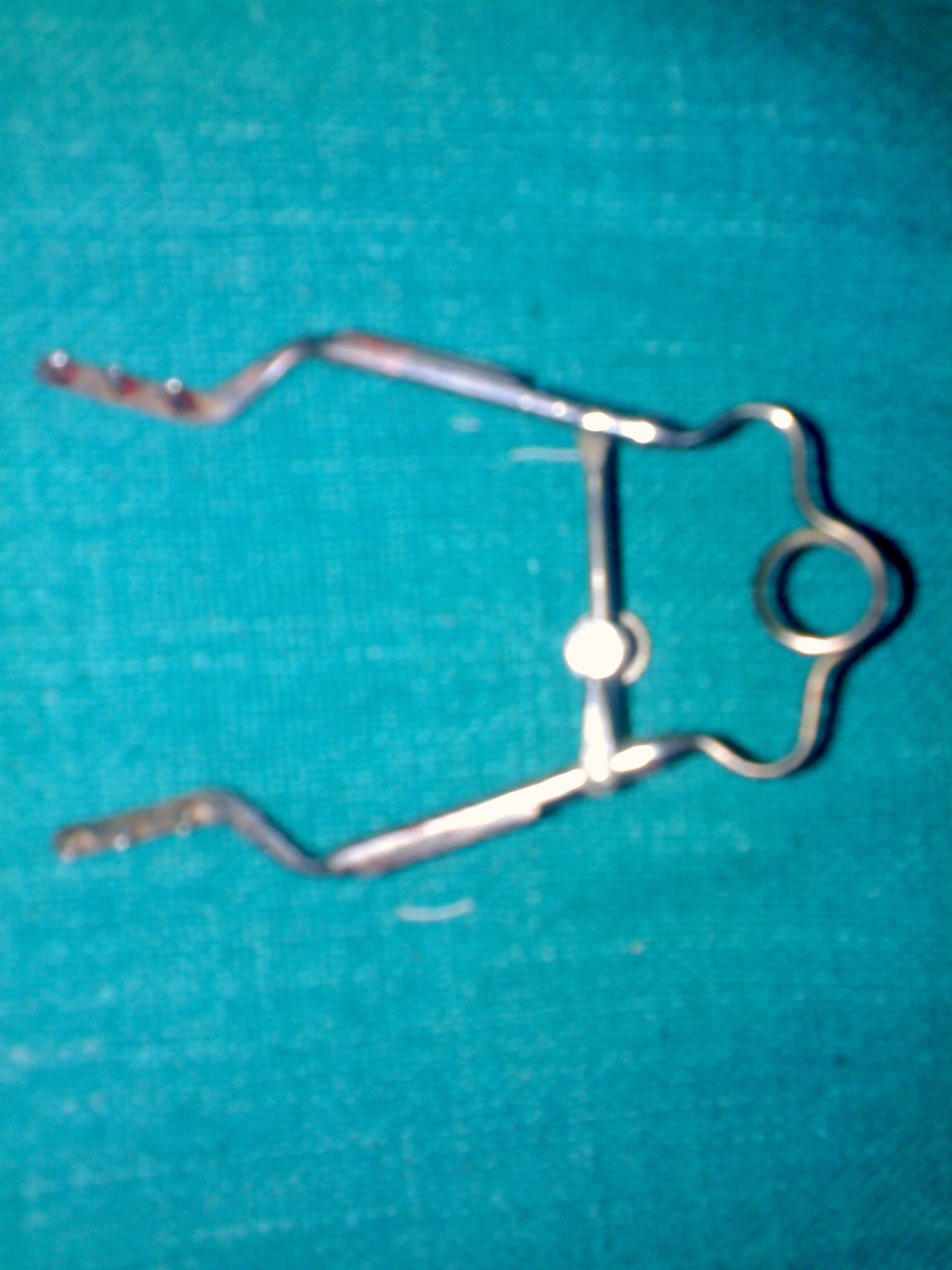
Muller's retractor, bottom view

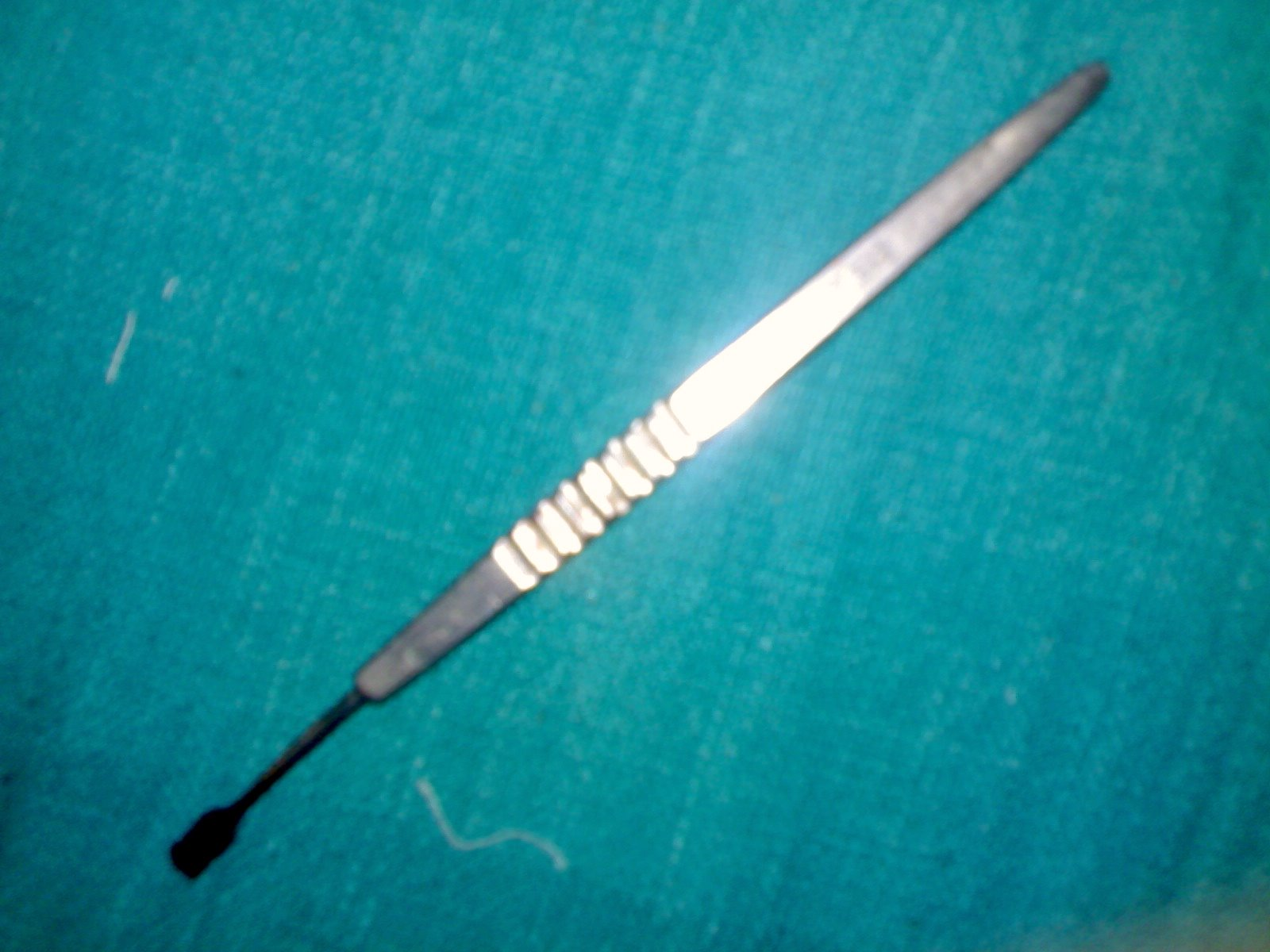
Angular keratotome

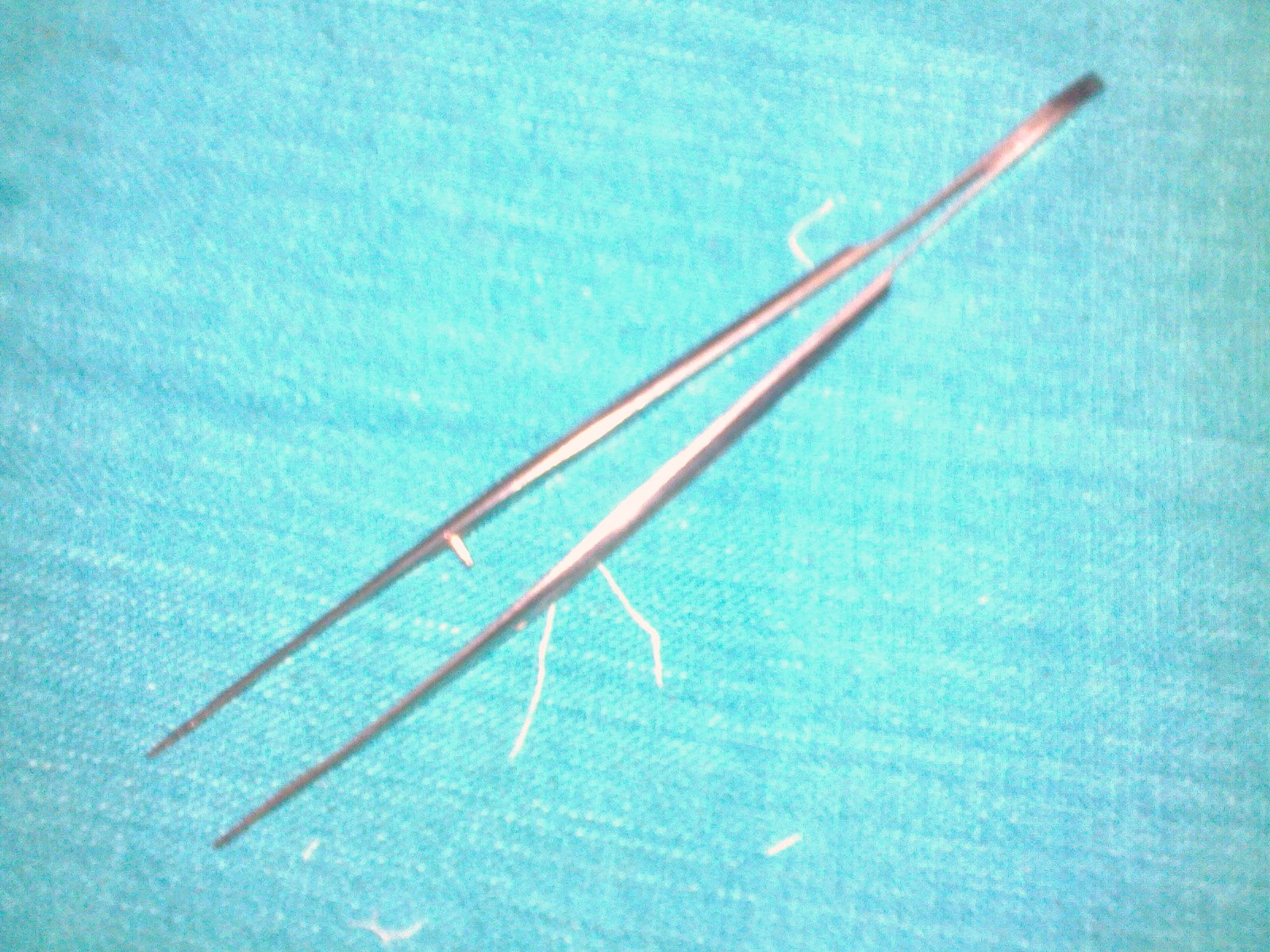
Long dissecting forceps

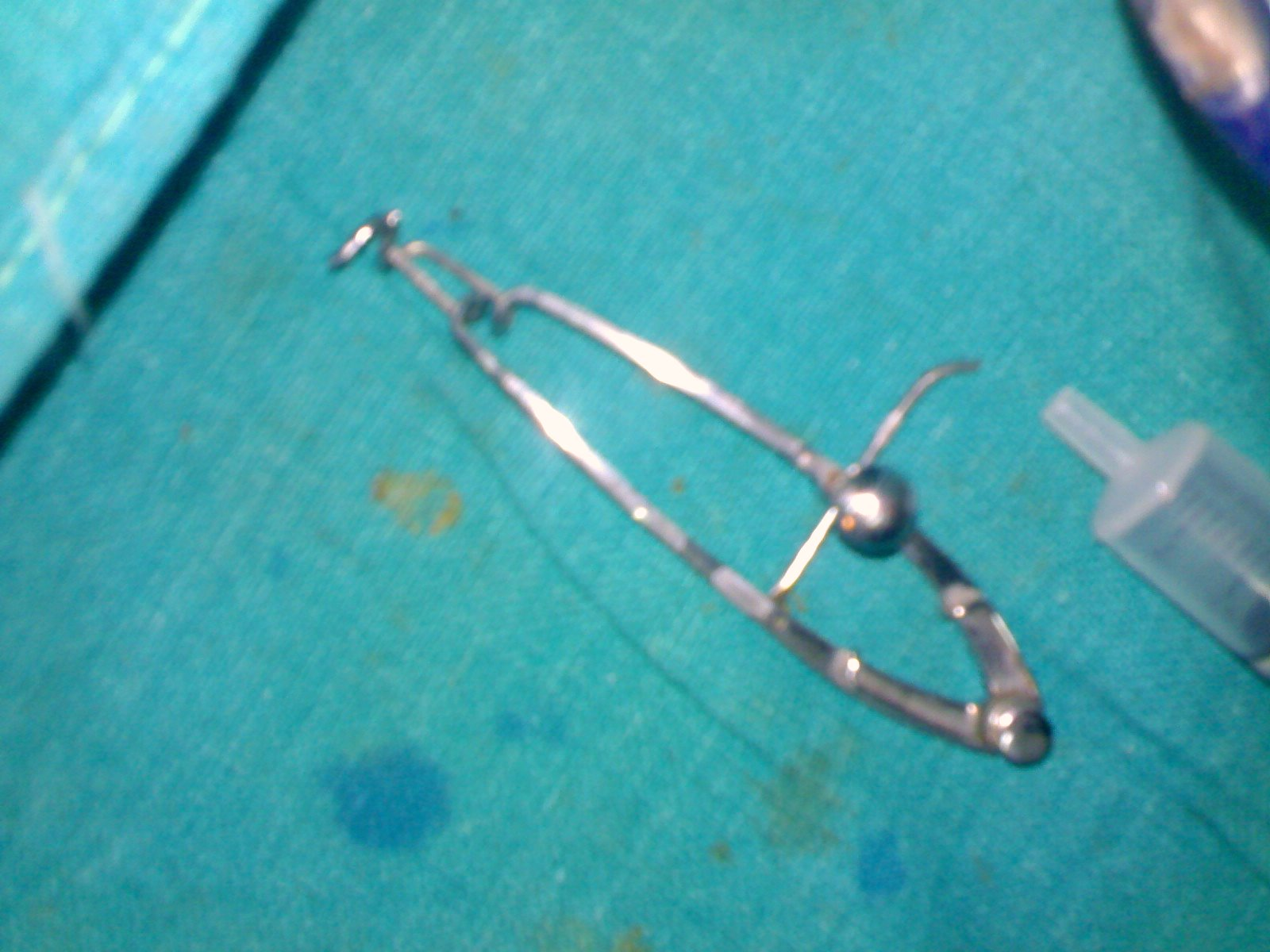
Universal eye speculum

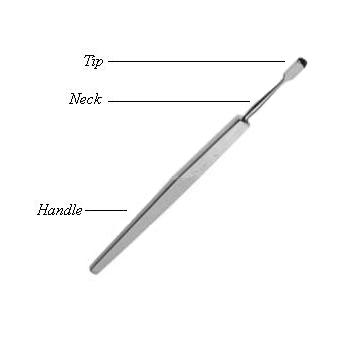
Rougine

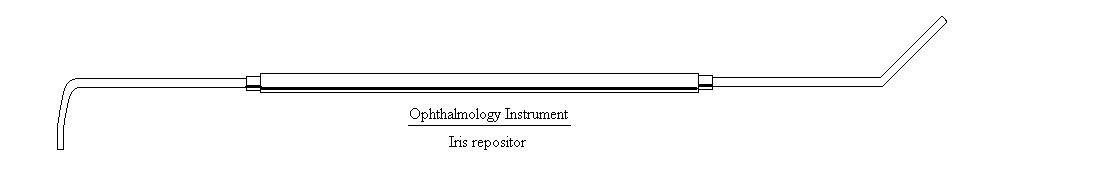
Iris repositor

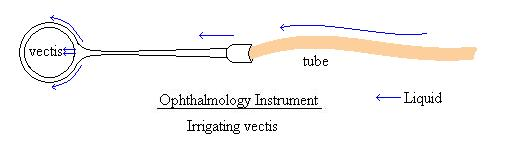
Irrigating vectis

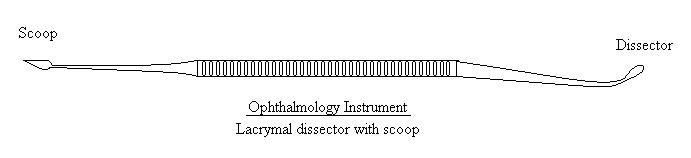
Lacrimal dissector with scoop

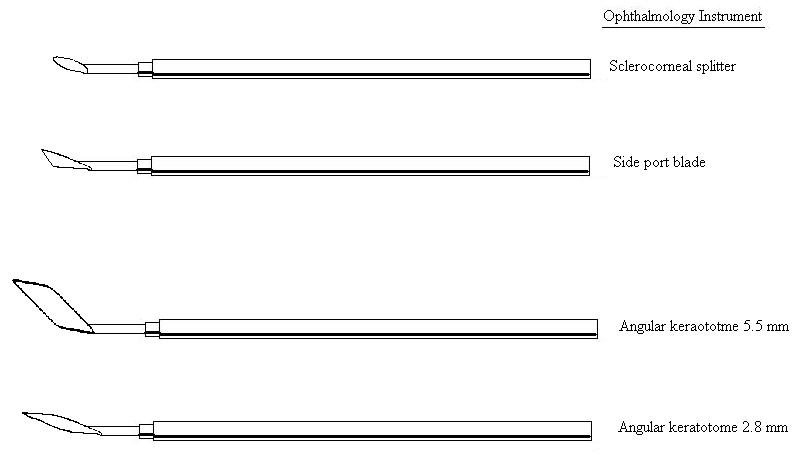
Special blades

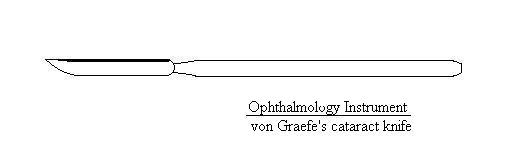
von Graefe's cataract knife

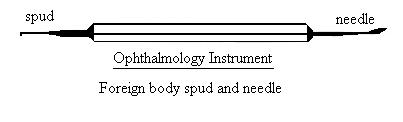
Foreign body spud and needle

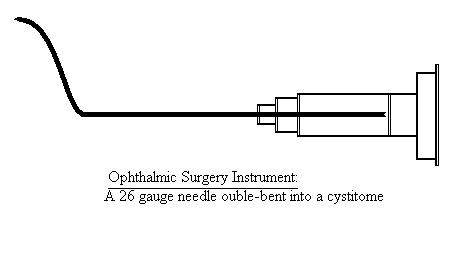
Cystitome

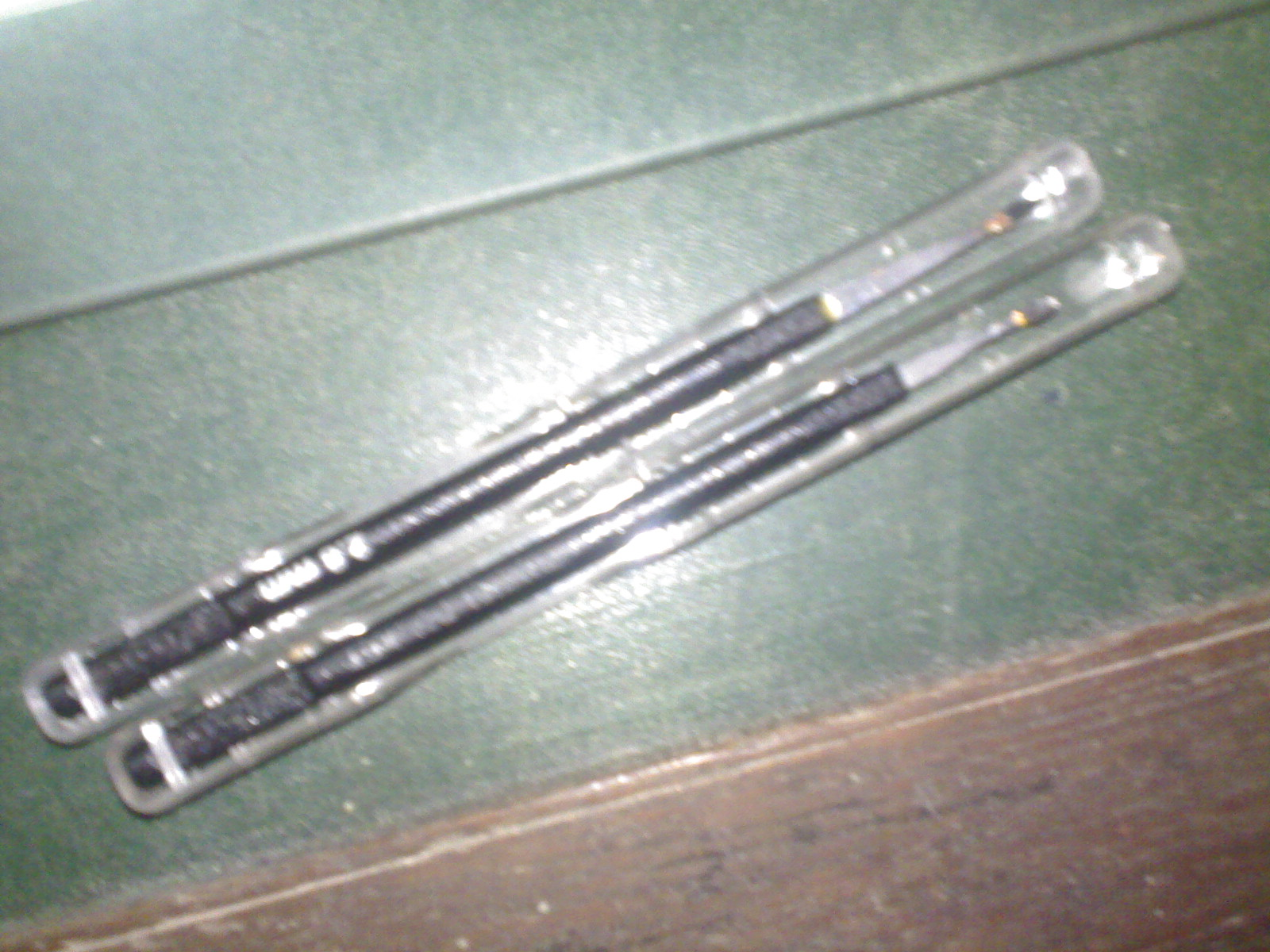
Angular keratotomes

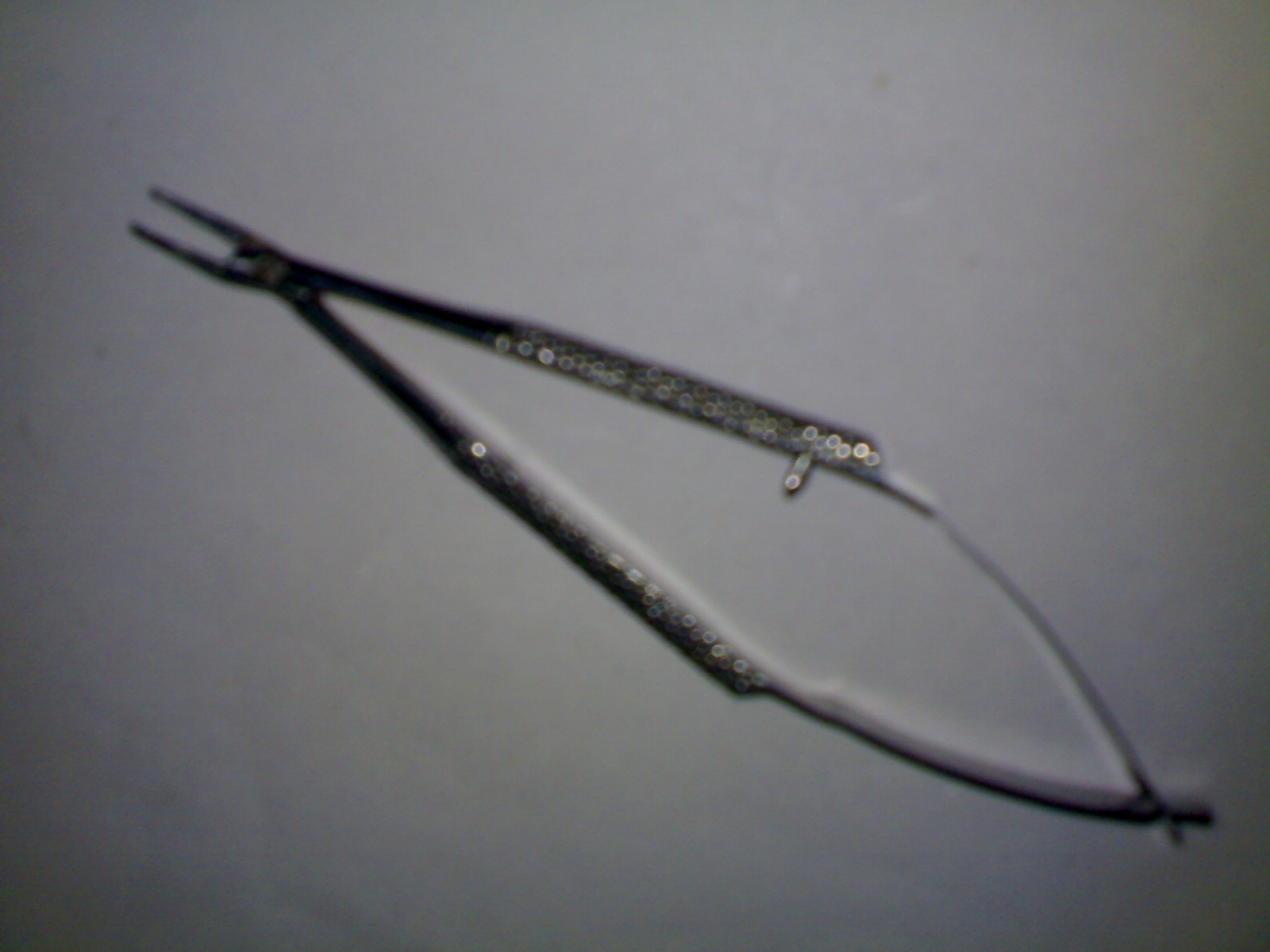
Barraquer's needle holder

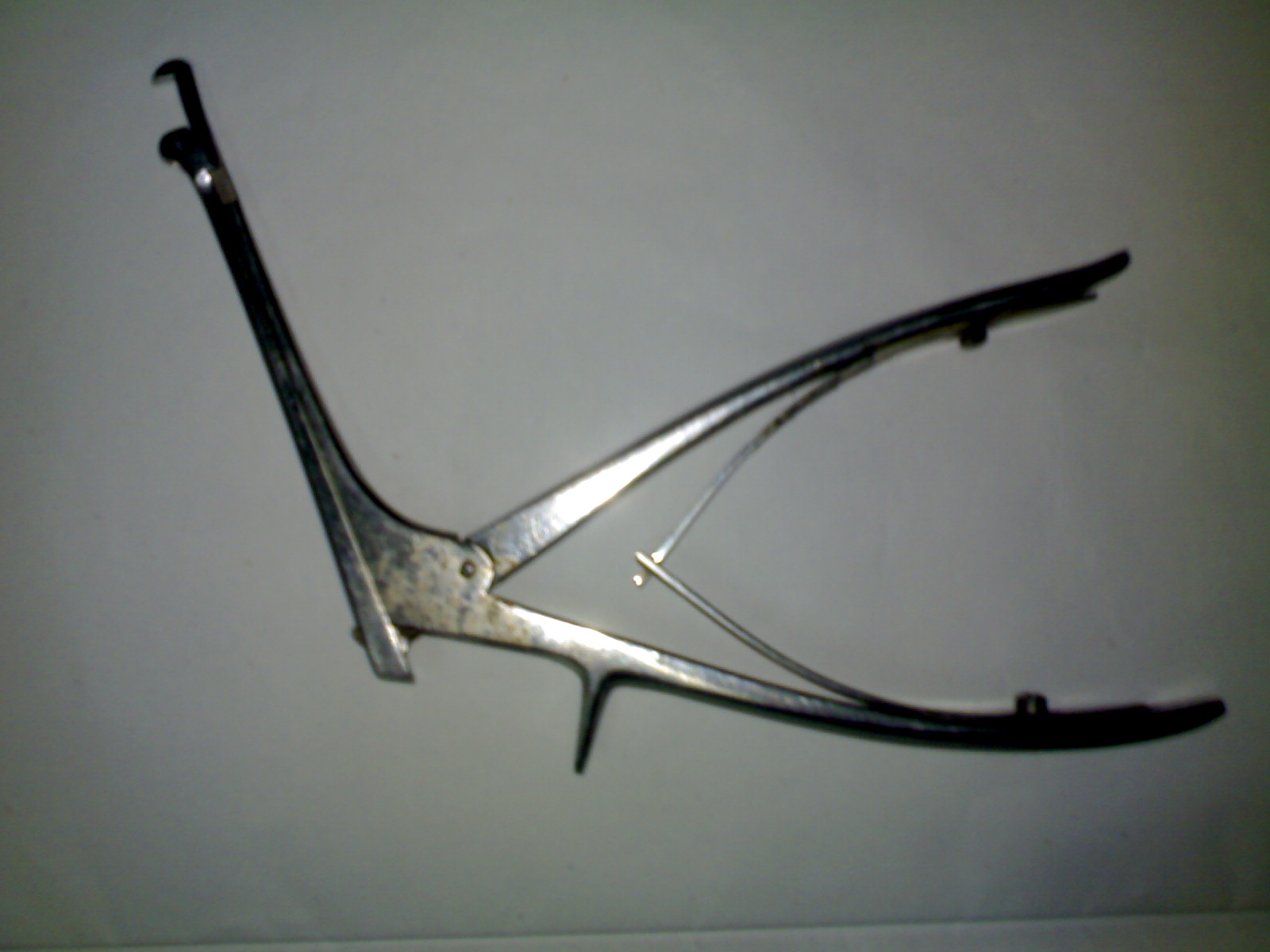
A bone punch

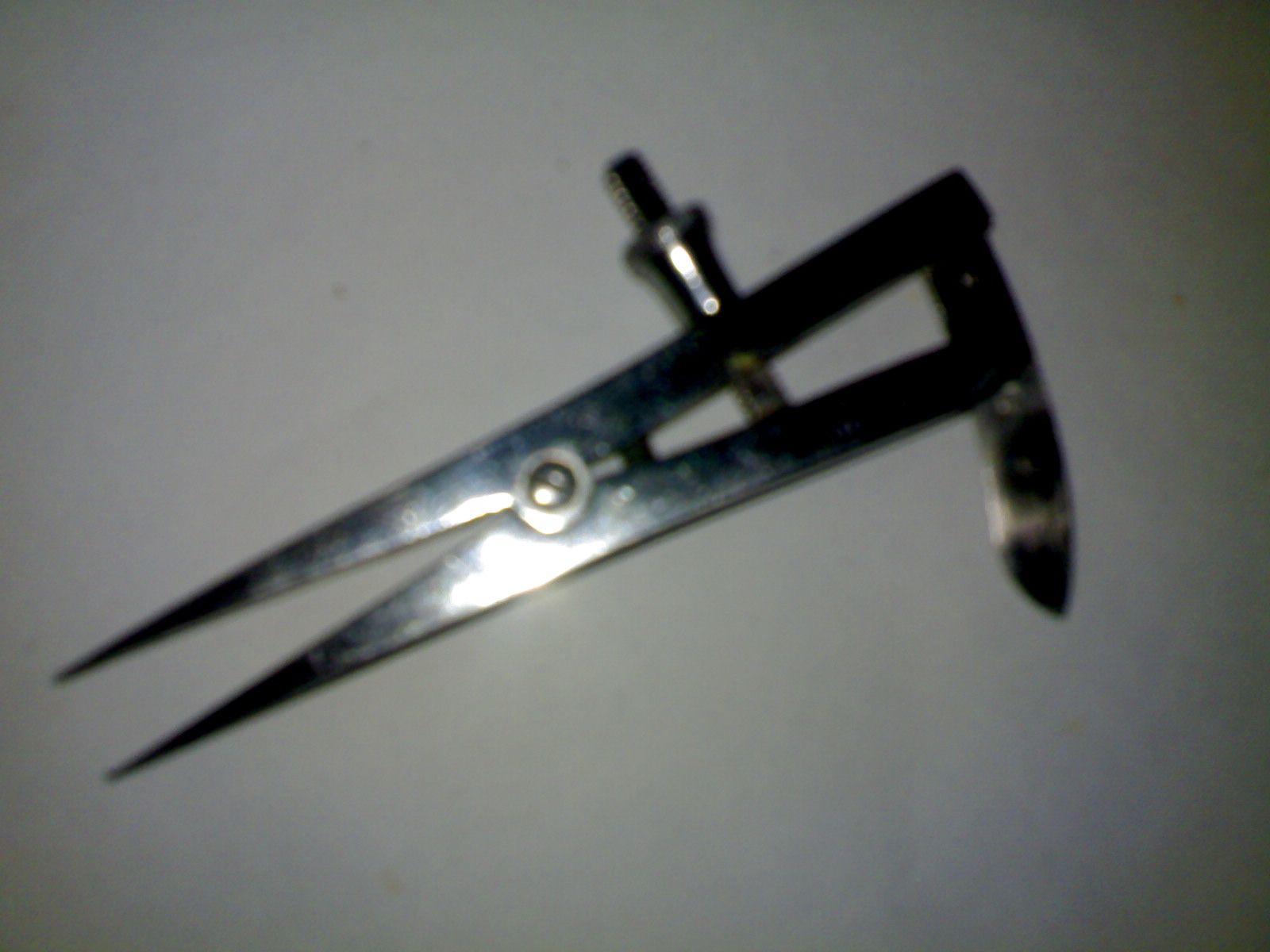
Callipers

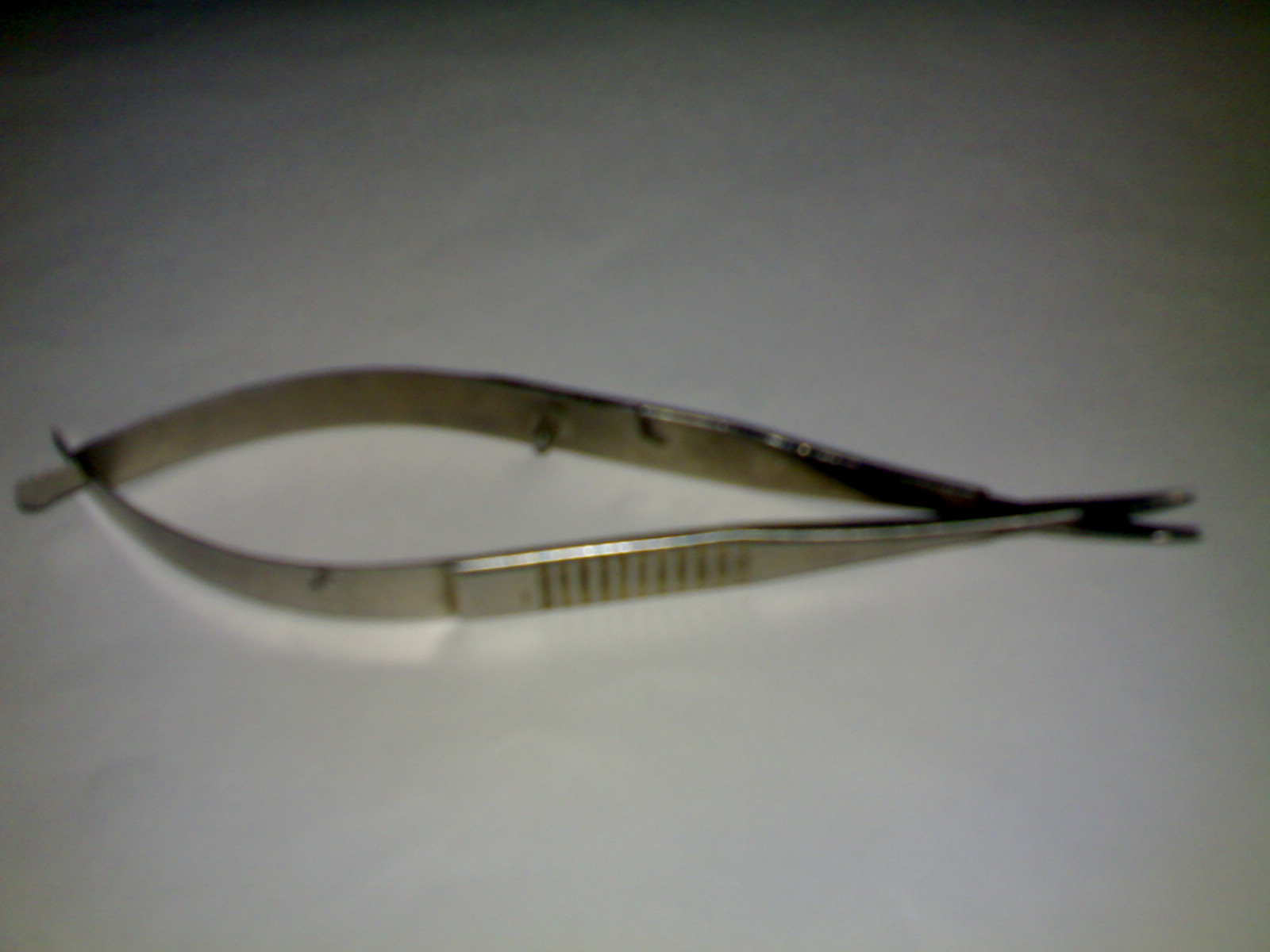
Corneal spring scissors

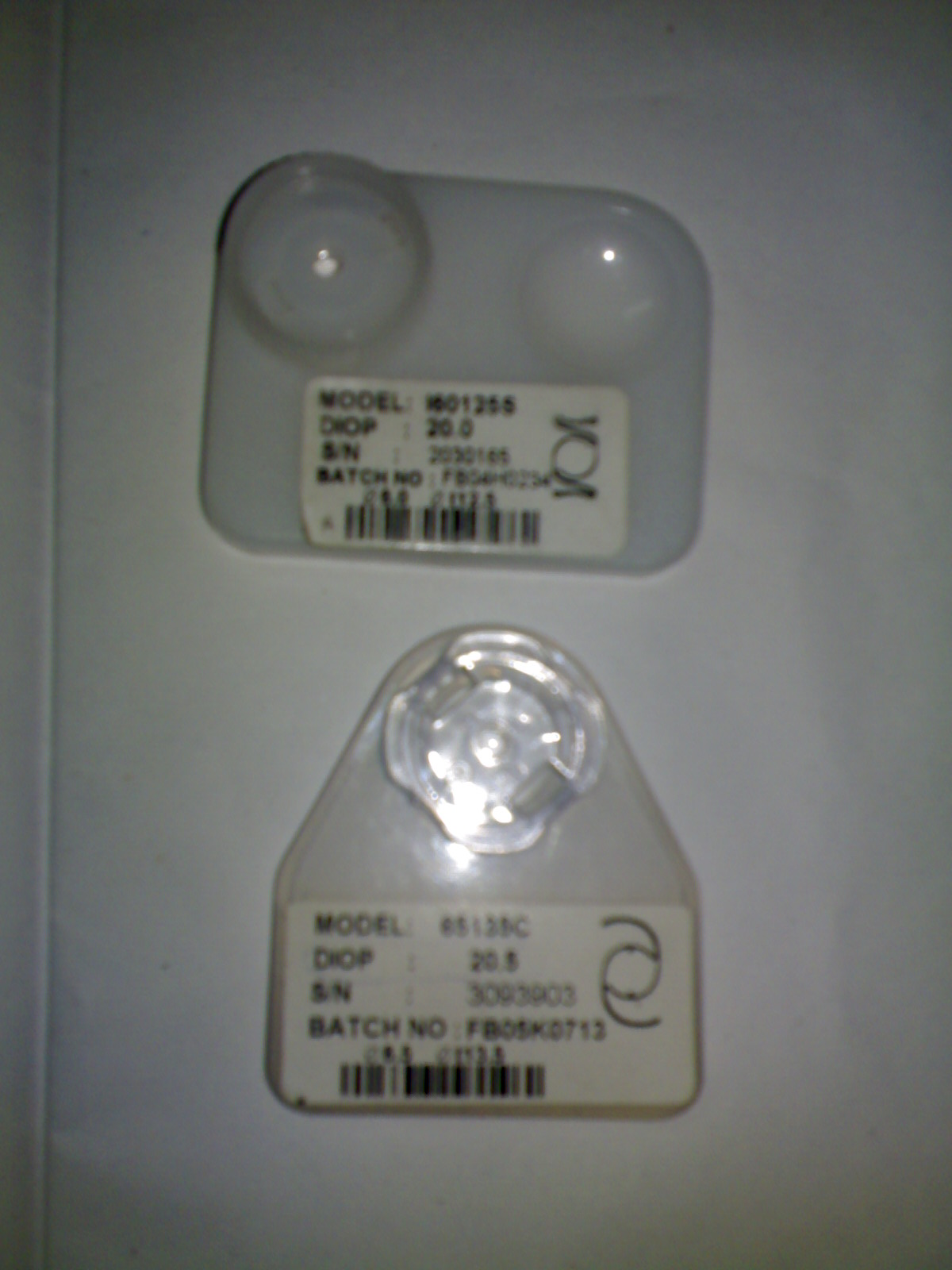
Intraoccular lenses in their cases

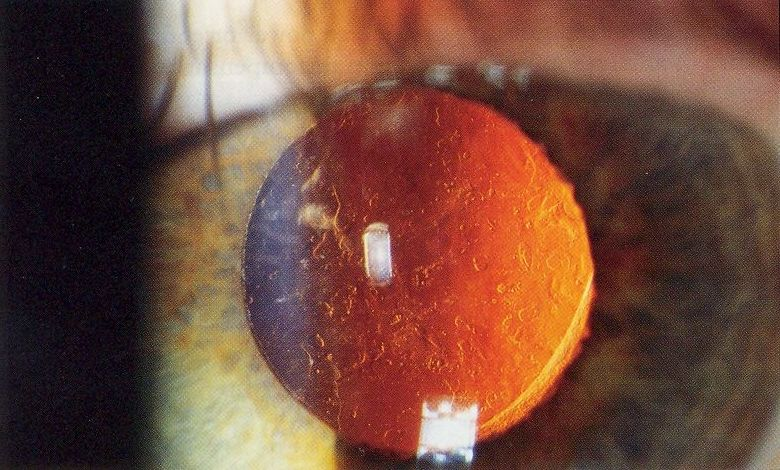
Intraoccular lens in place

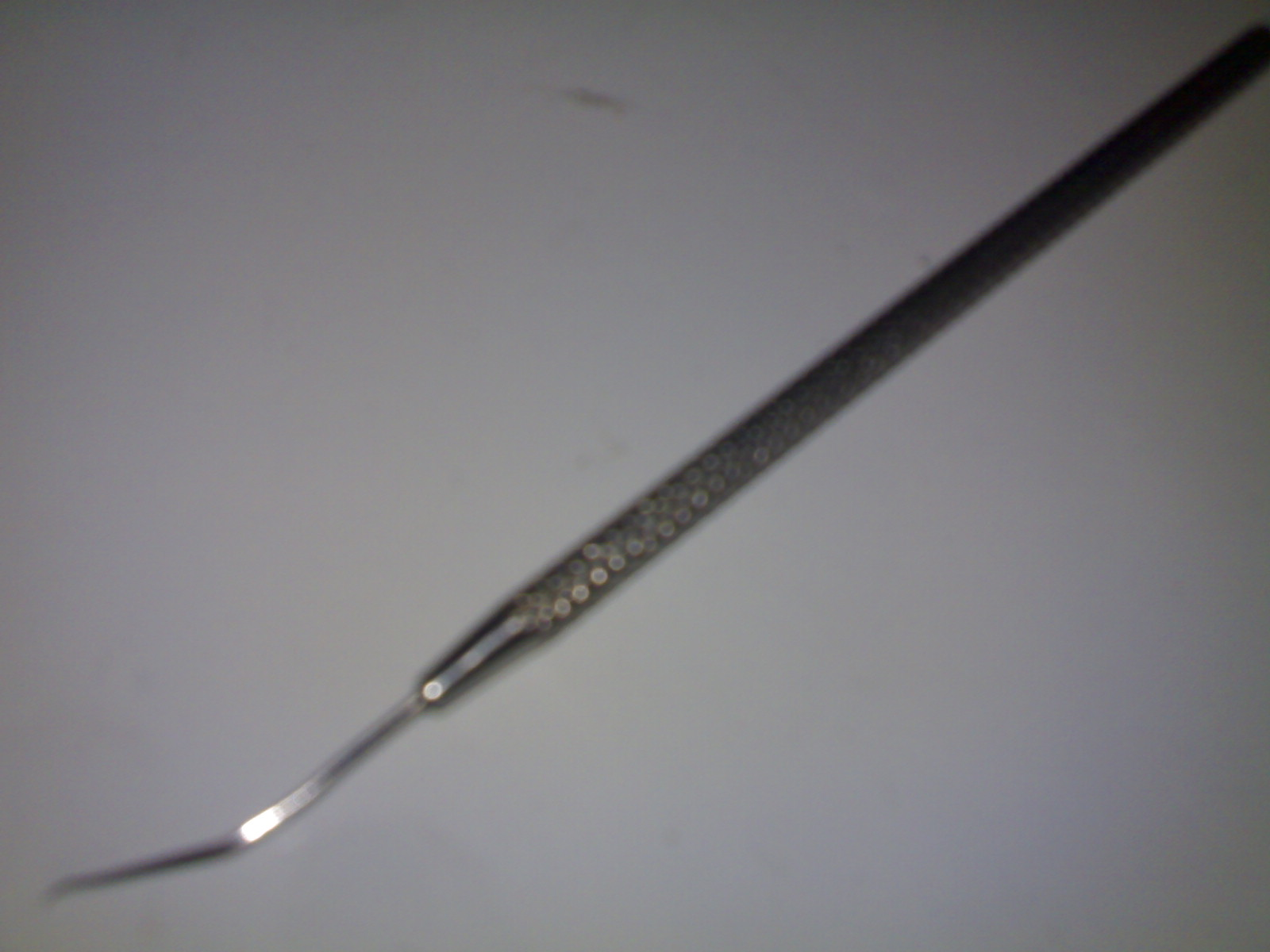
Intraoccular lens "dialer" or Sinsky hook

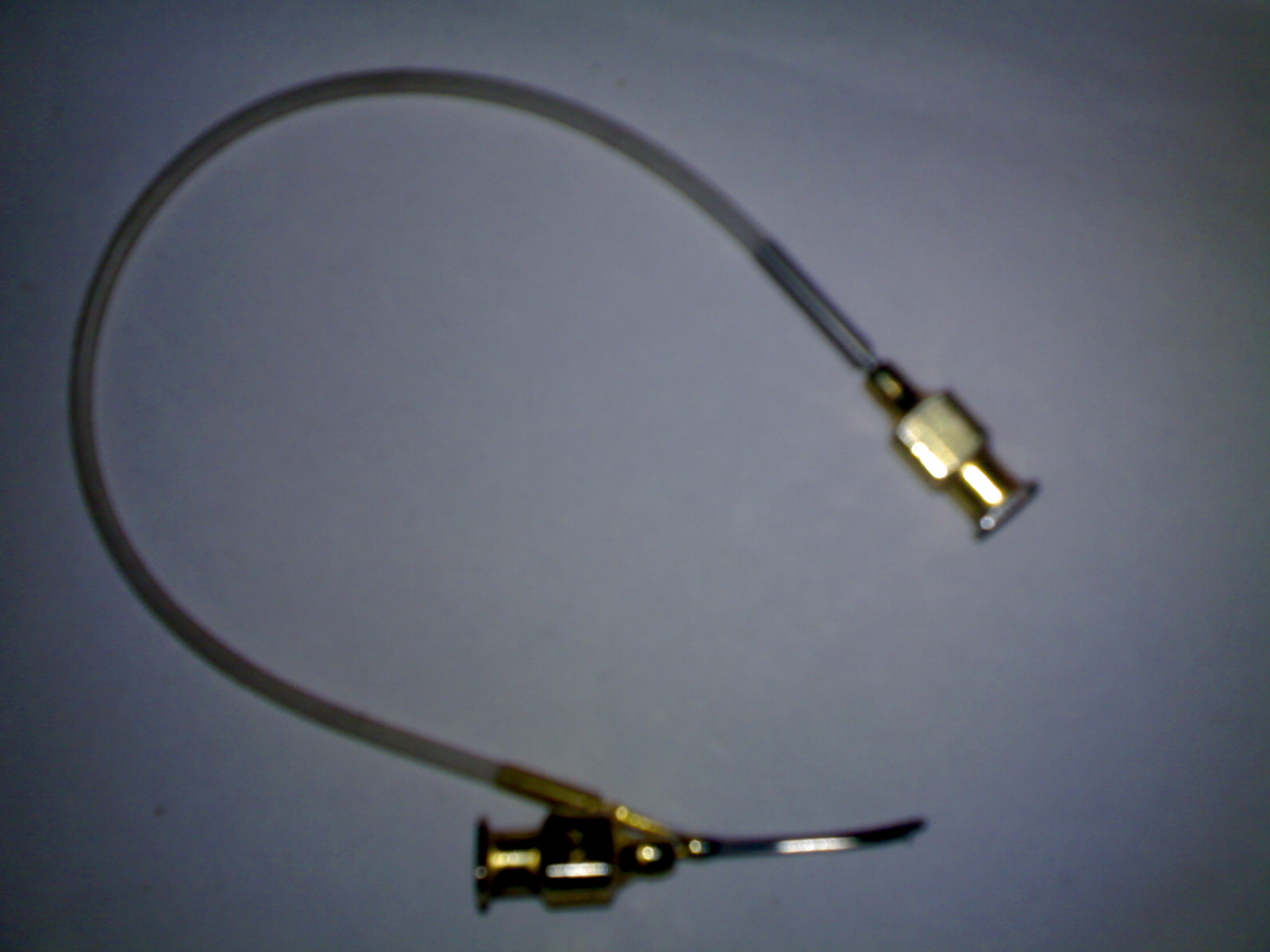
Irrigating aspirating bi-way cannula

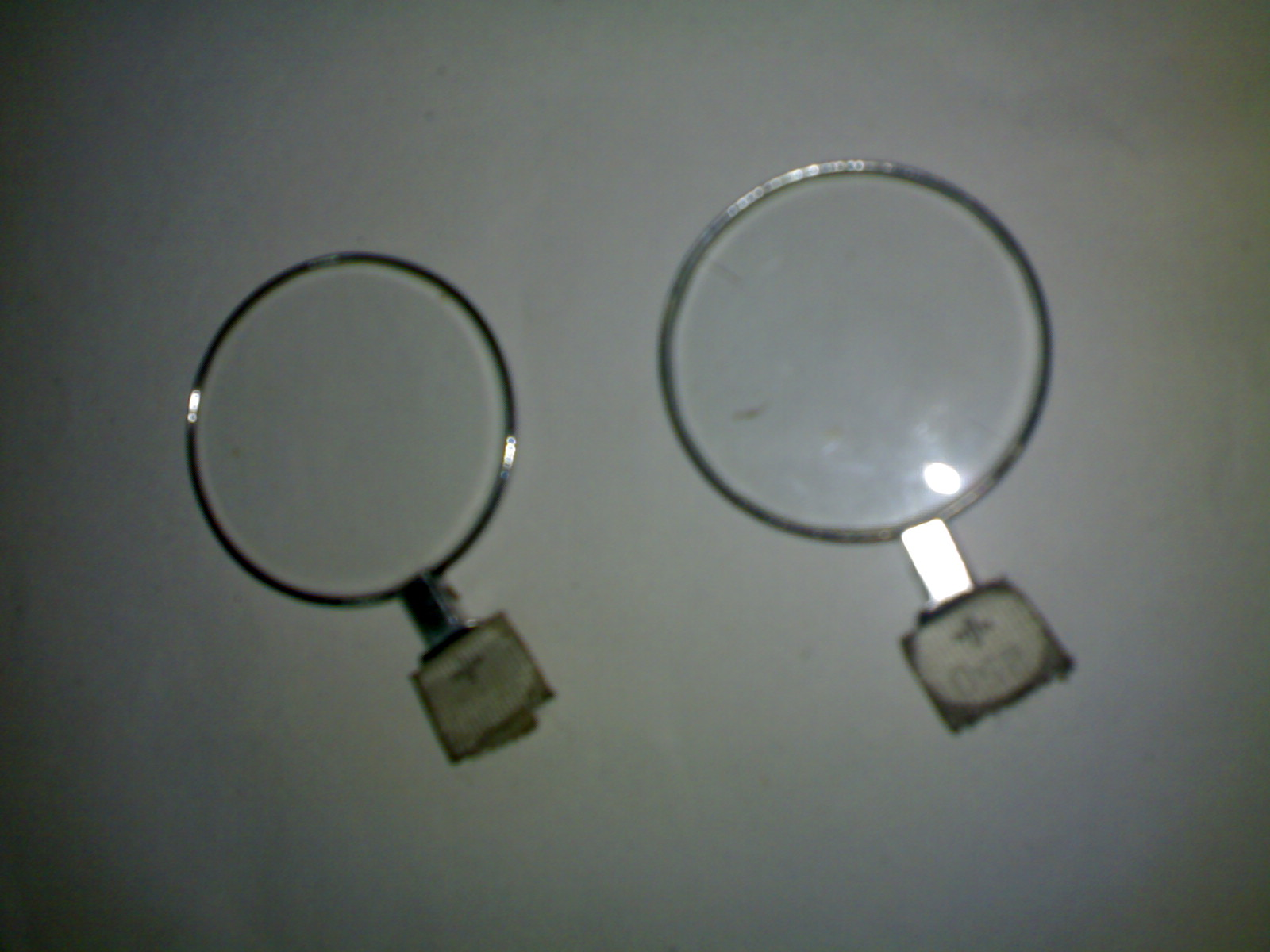
Lenses used for refraction testing

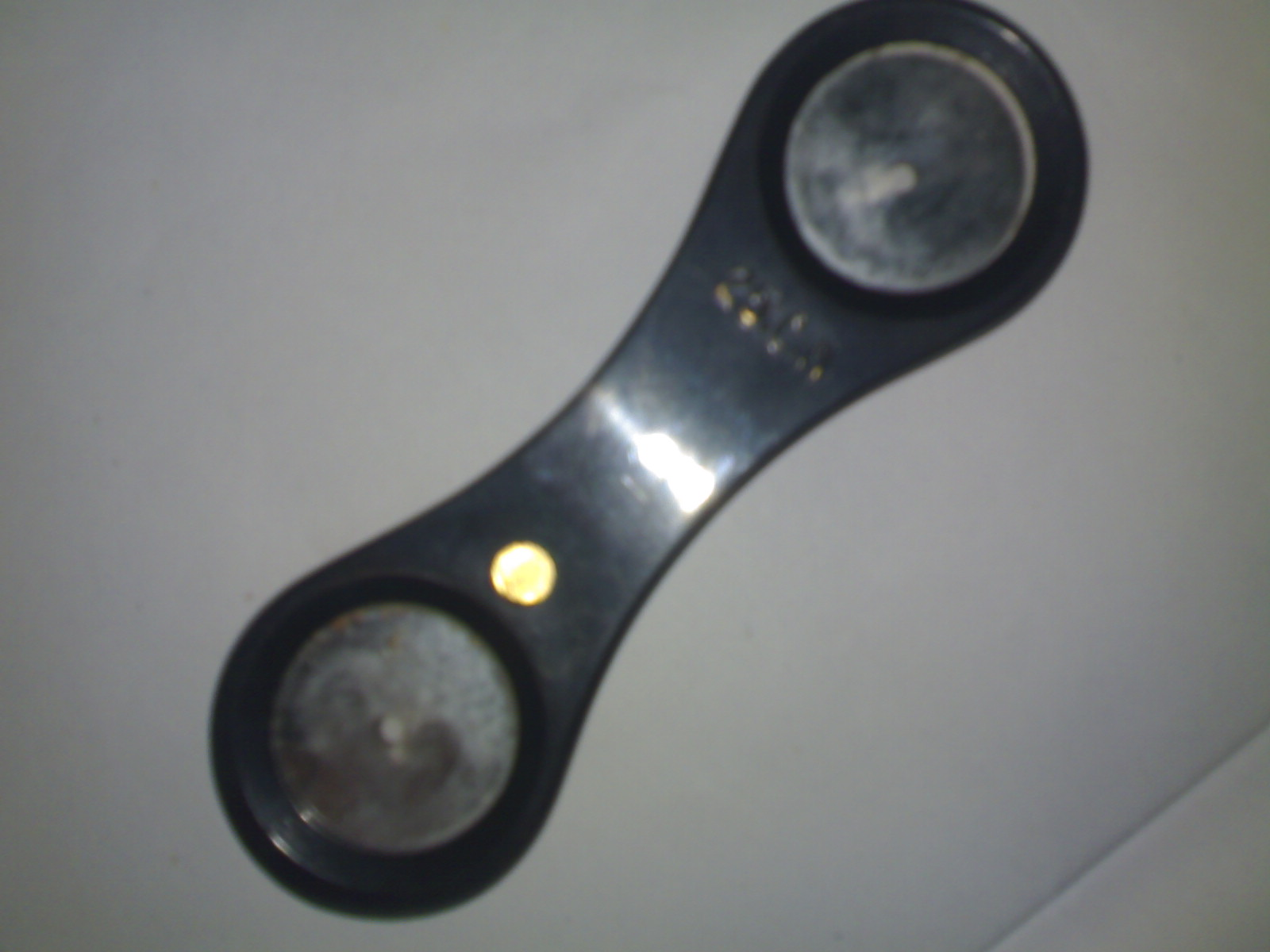
A retinoscope

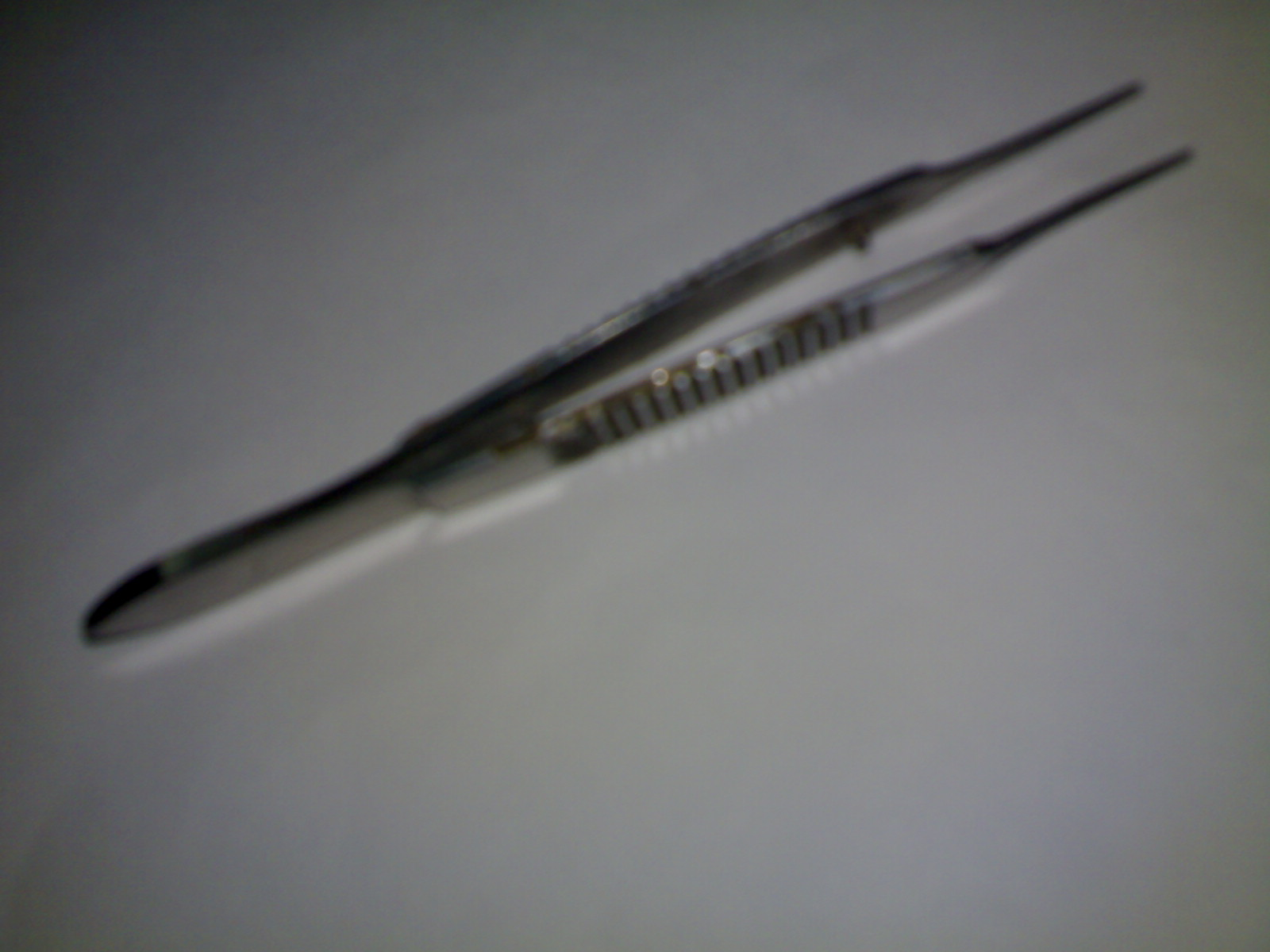
Suture tying forceps for fine sutures like 8-0

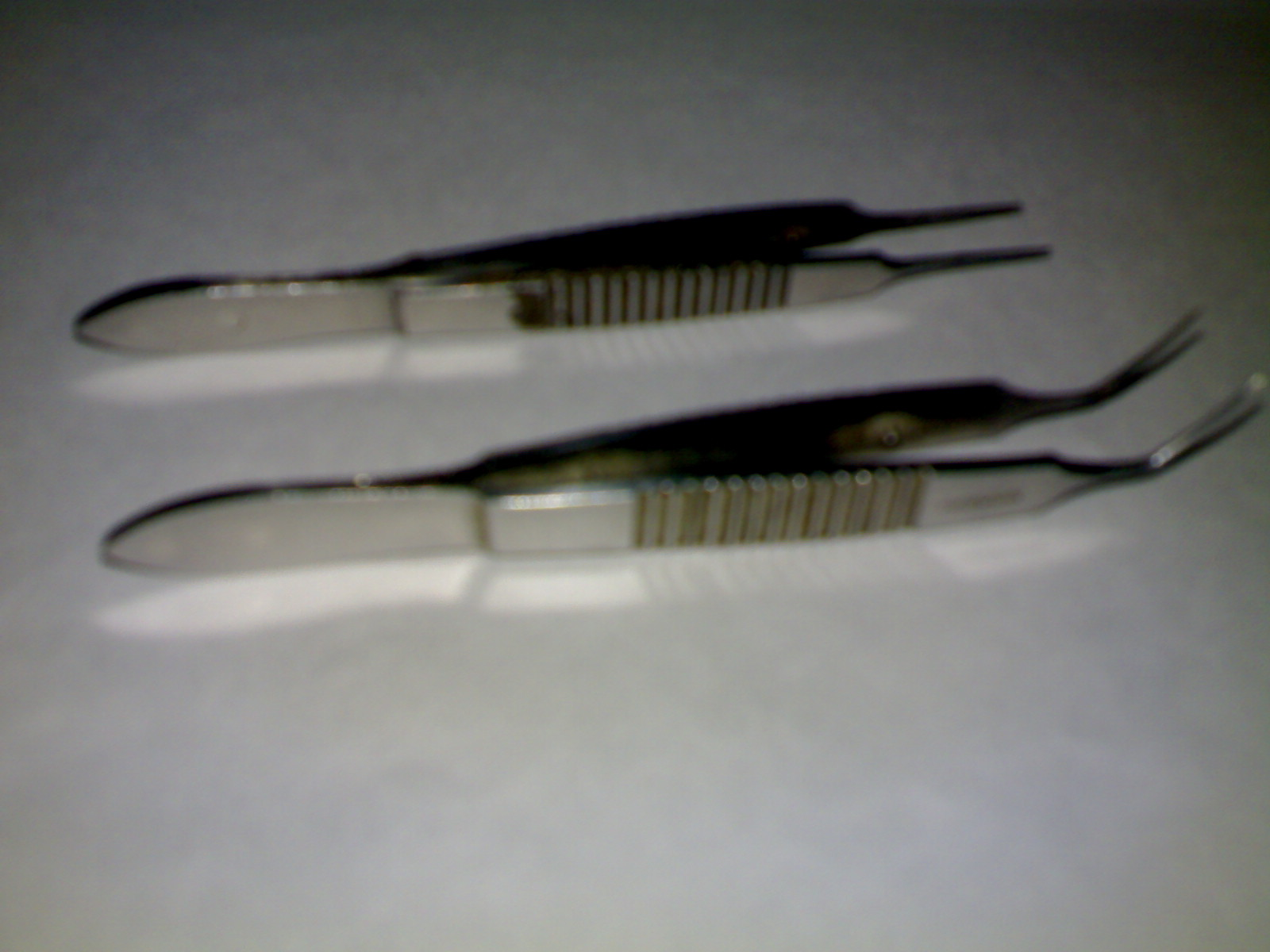
Upper one: Suture tying forceps; Lower one: Iris forceps; For comparison

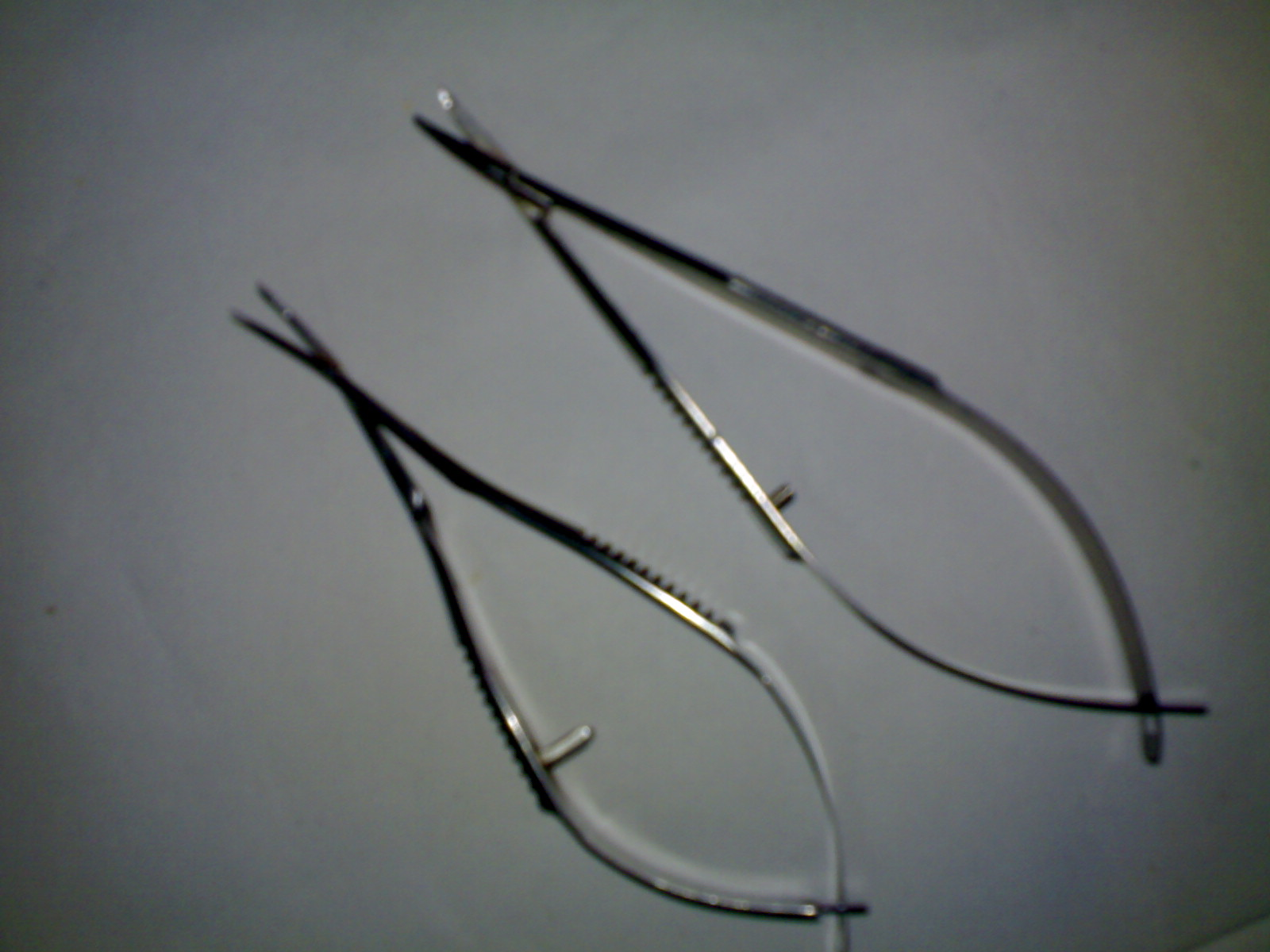
Upper right: Corneal spring scissors; Lower left: Vanna's scissors; for comparison

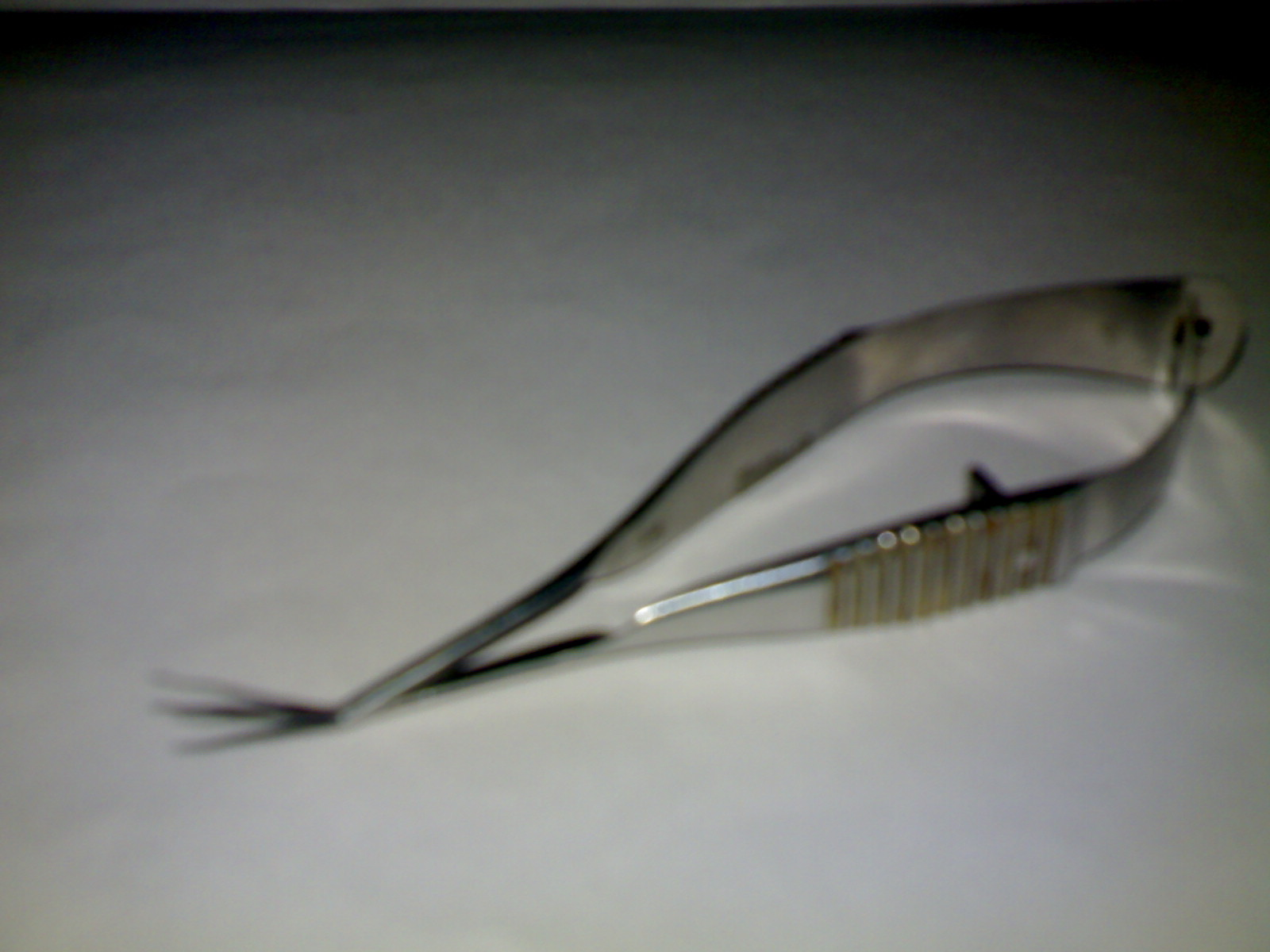
Vanna's scissors

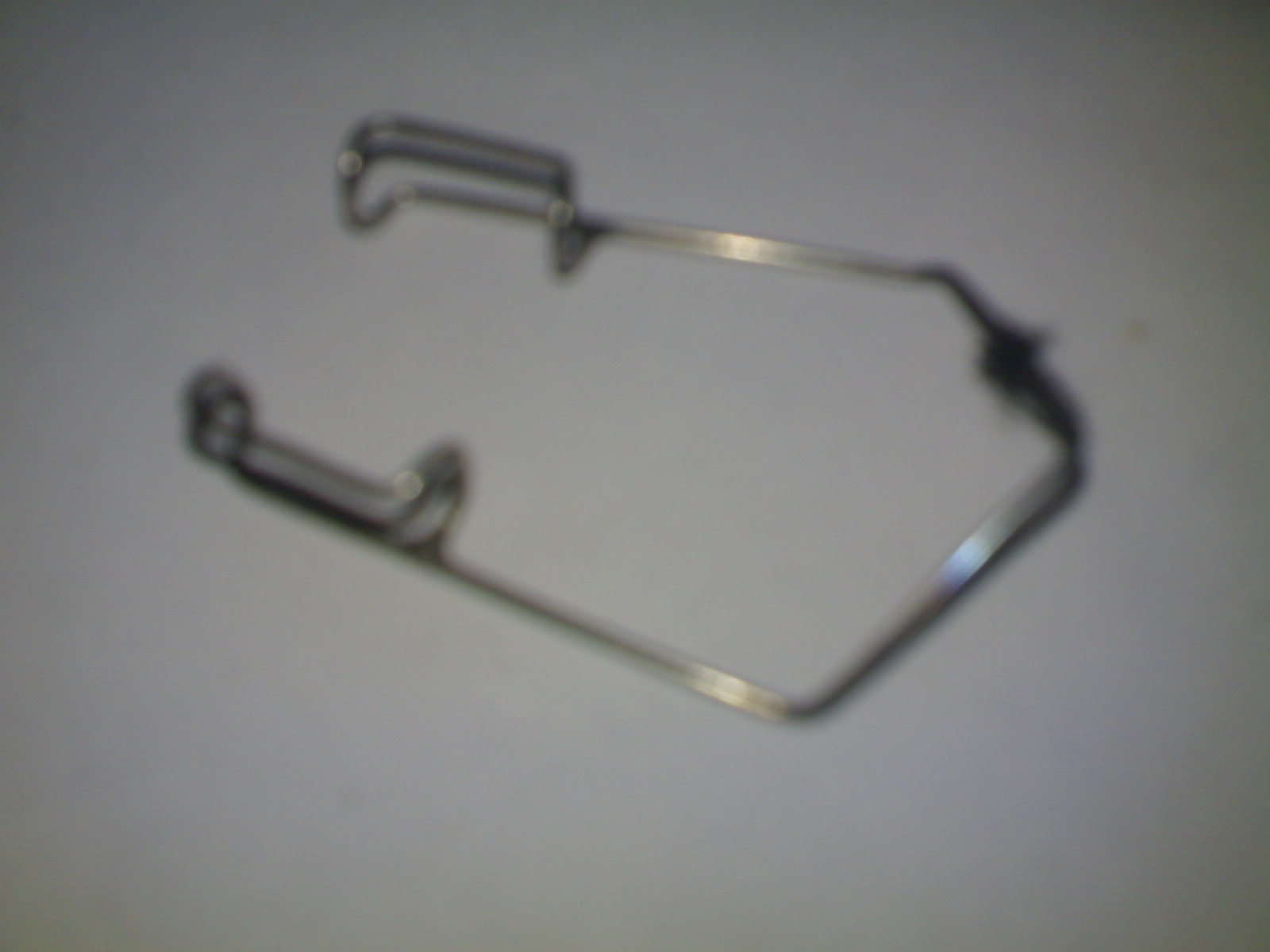
Wire speculum

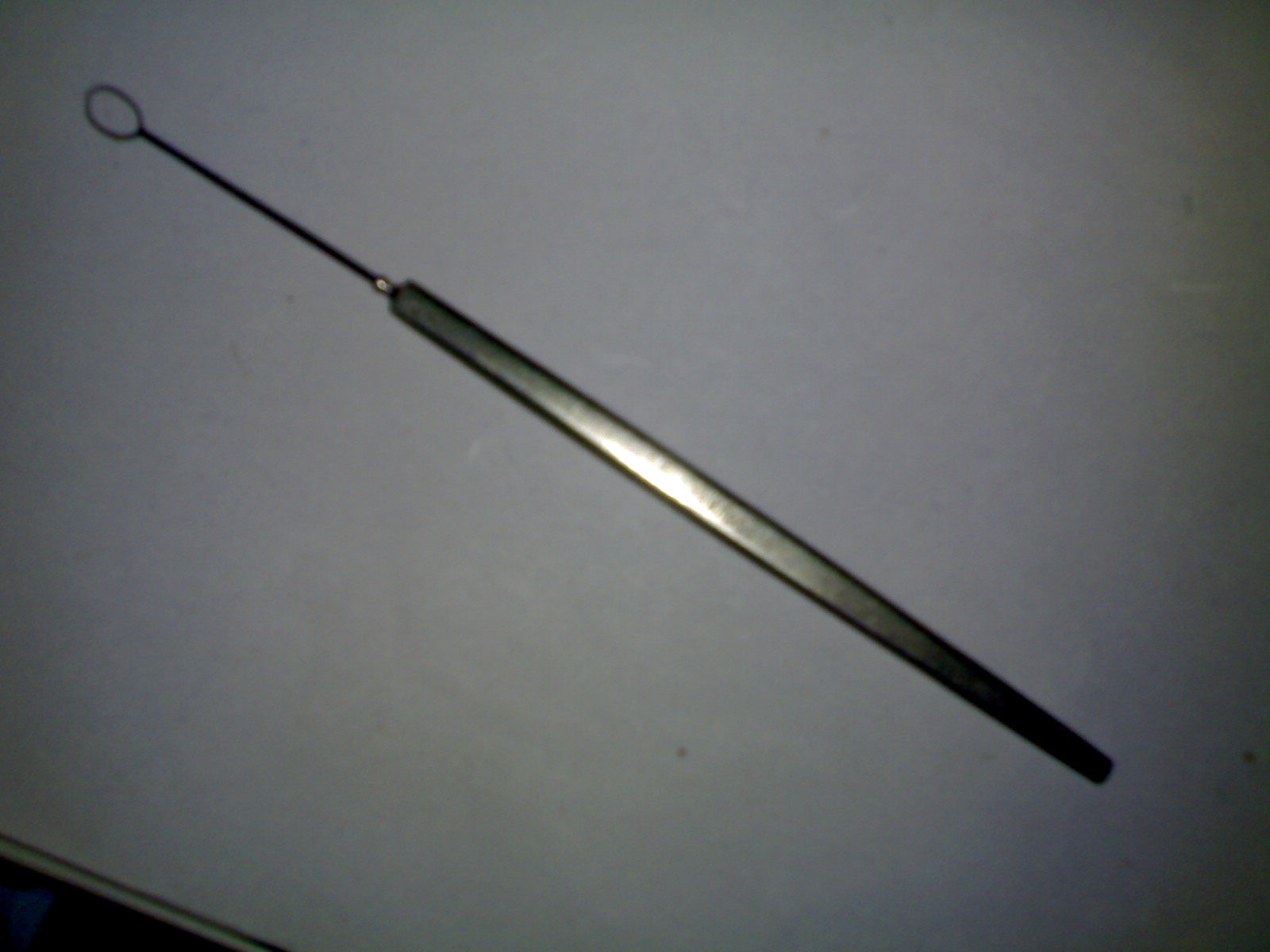
Wire vectis

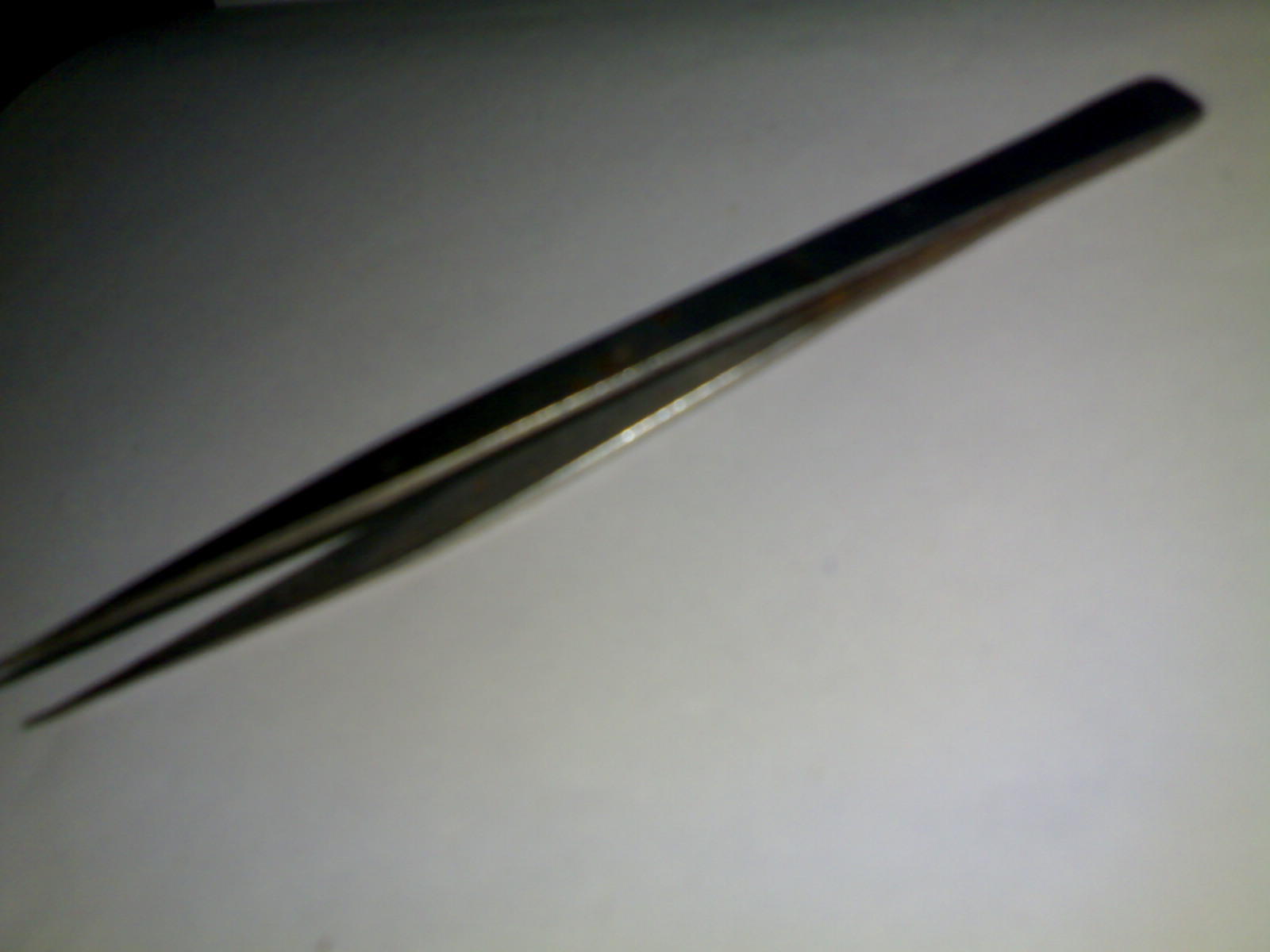
Plain dissecting forceps

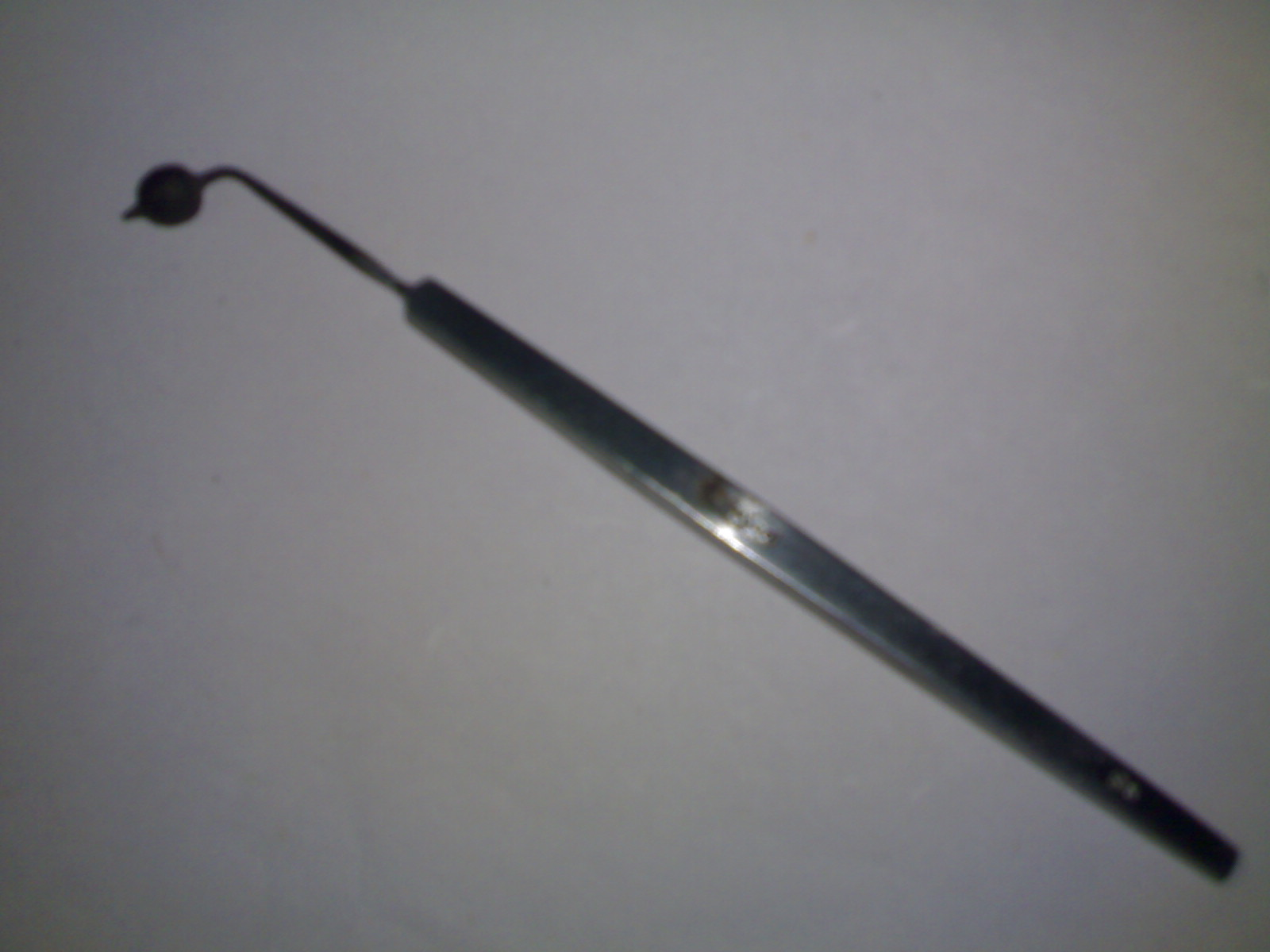
Thermocautery

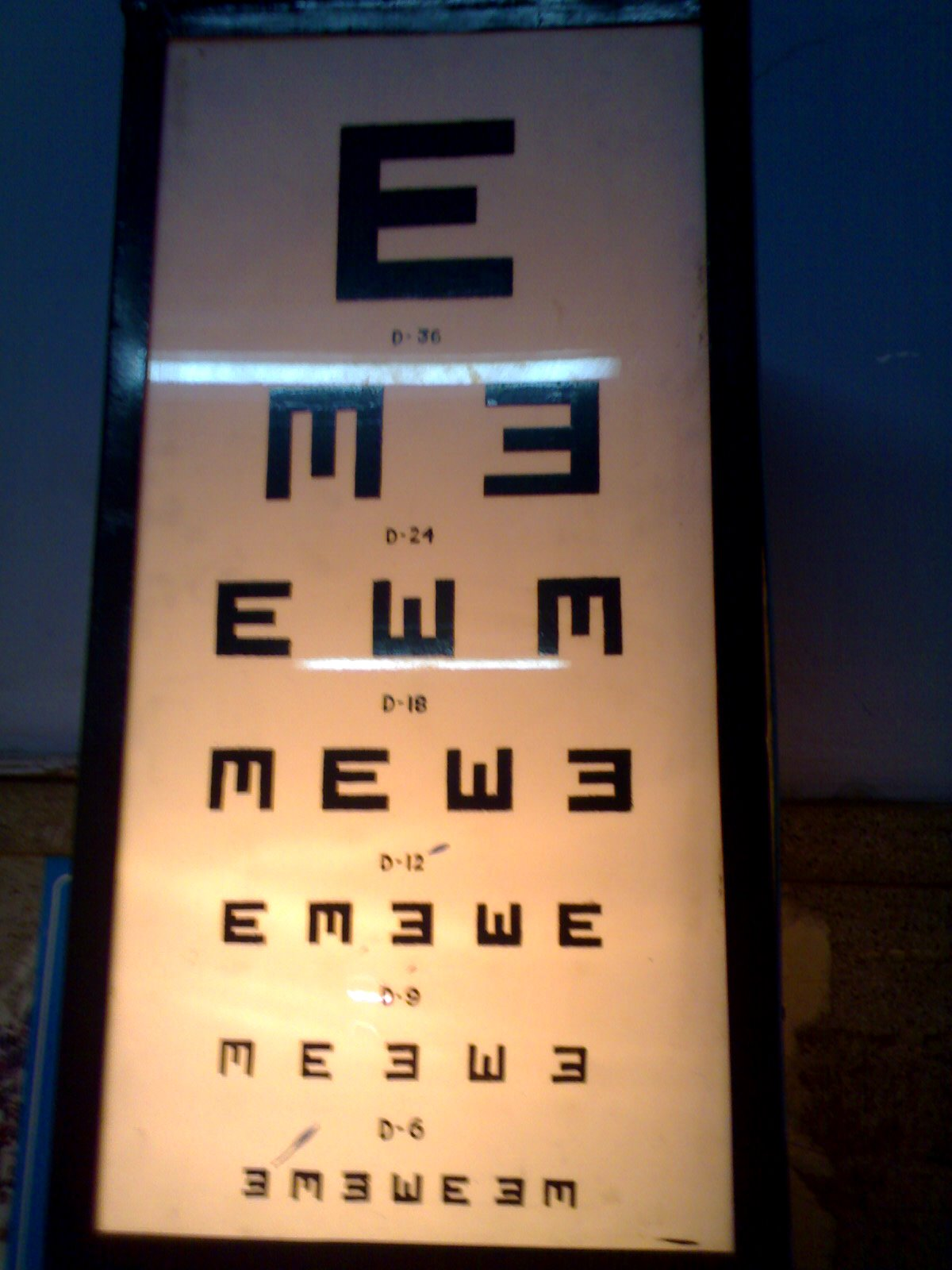
A standard illuminated E chart

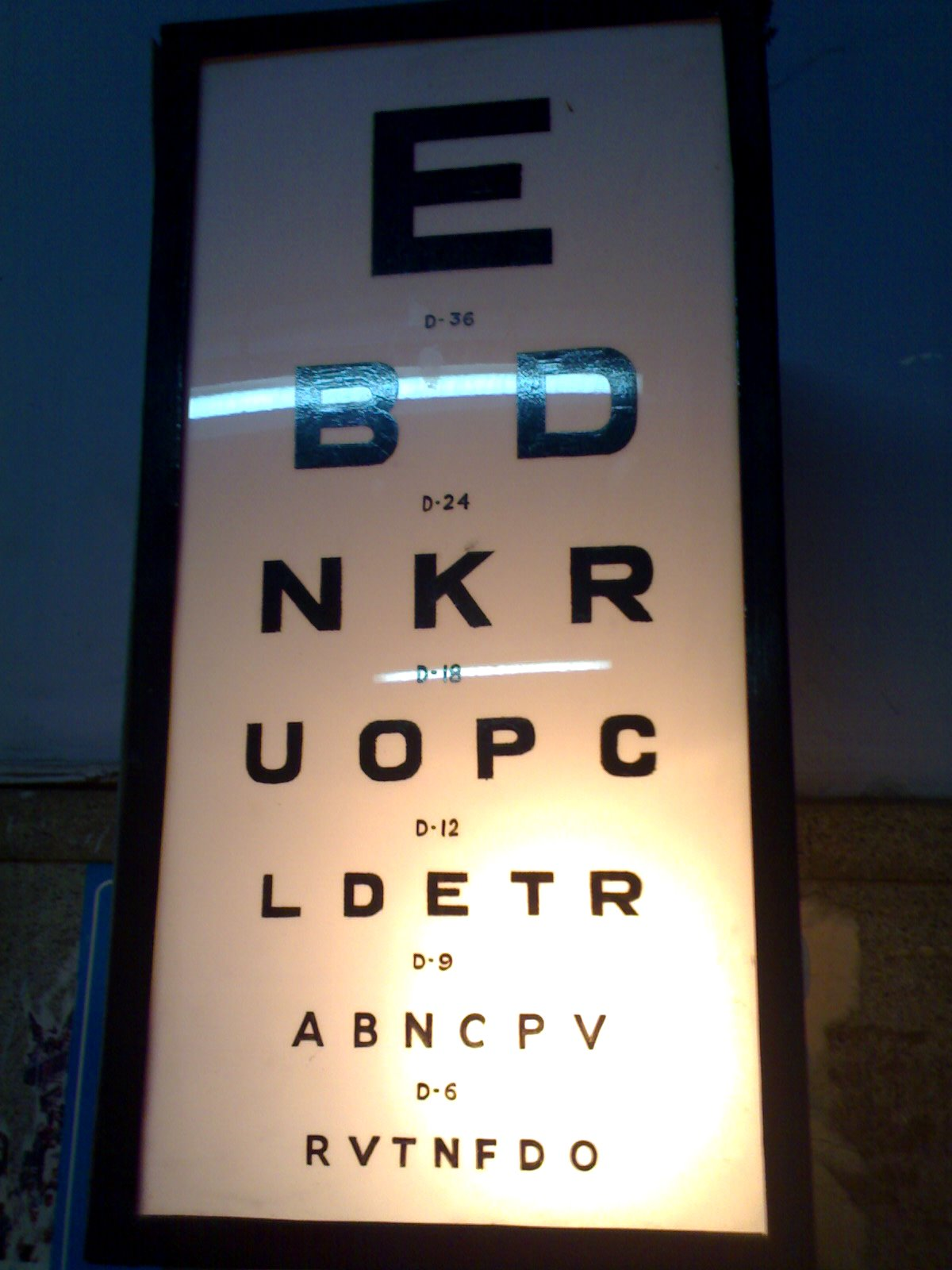
A standard illuminated Snellen's chart for distant vision

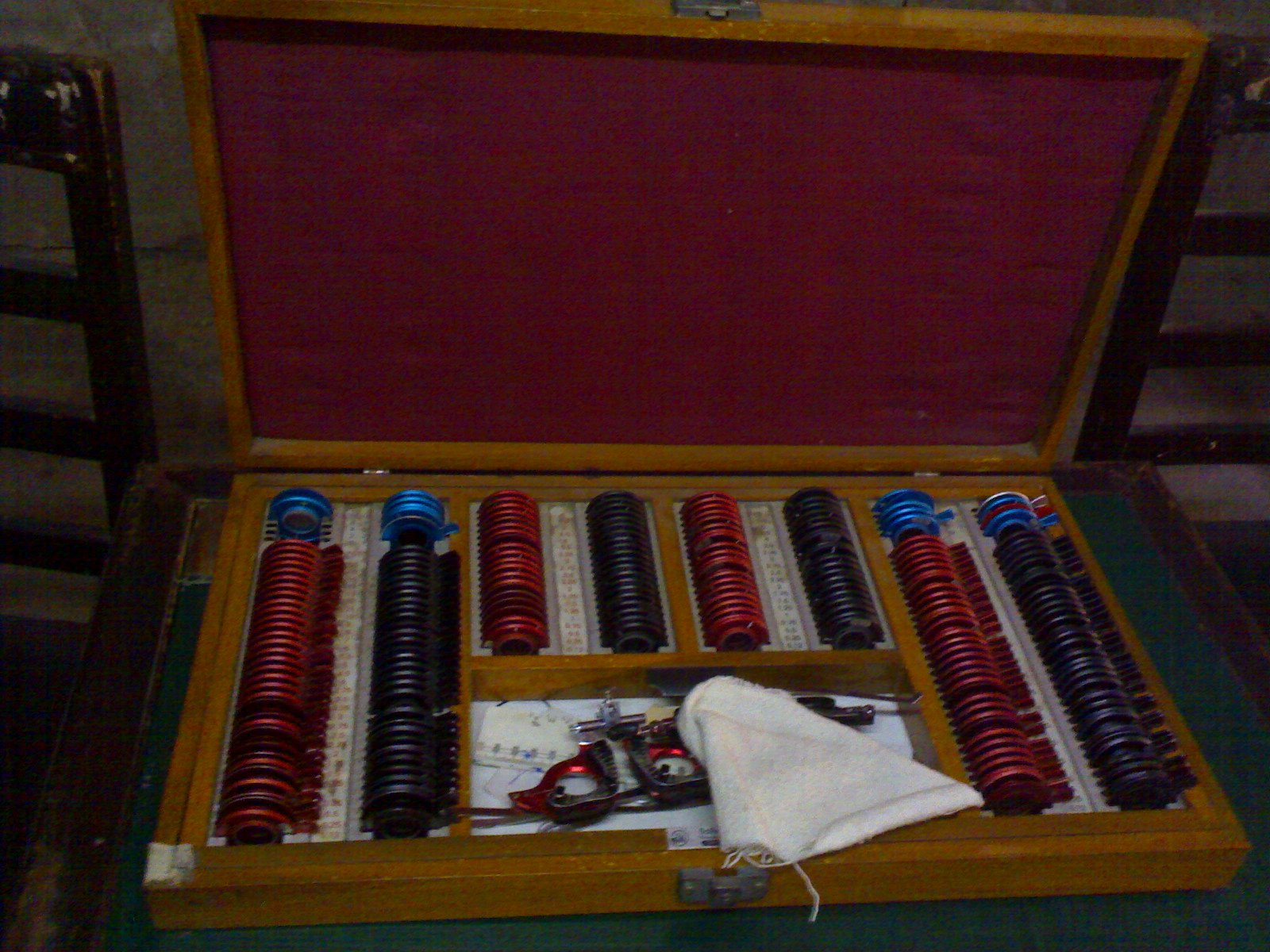
A set of lenses used in refraction testing

Ishihara Plate 9

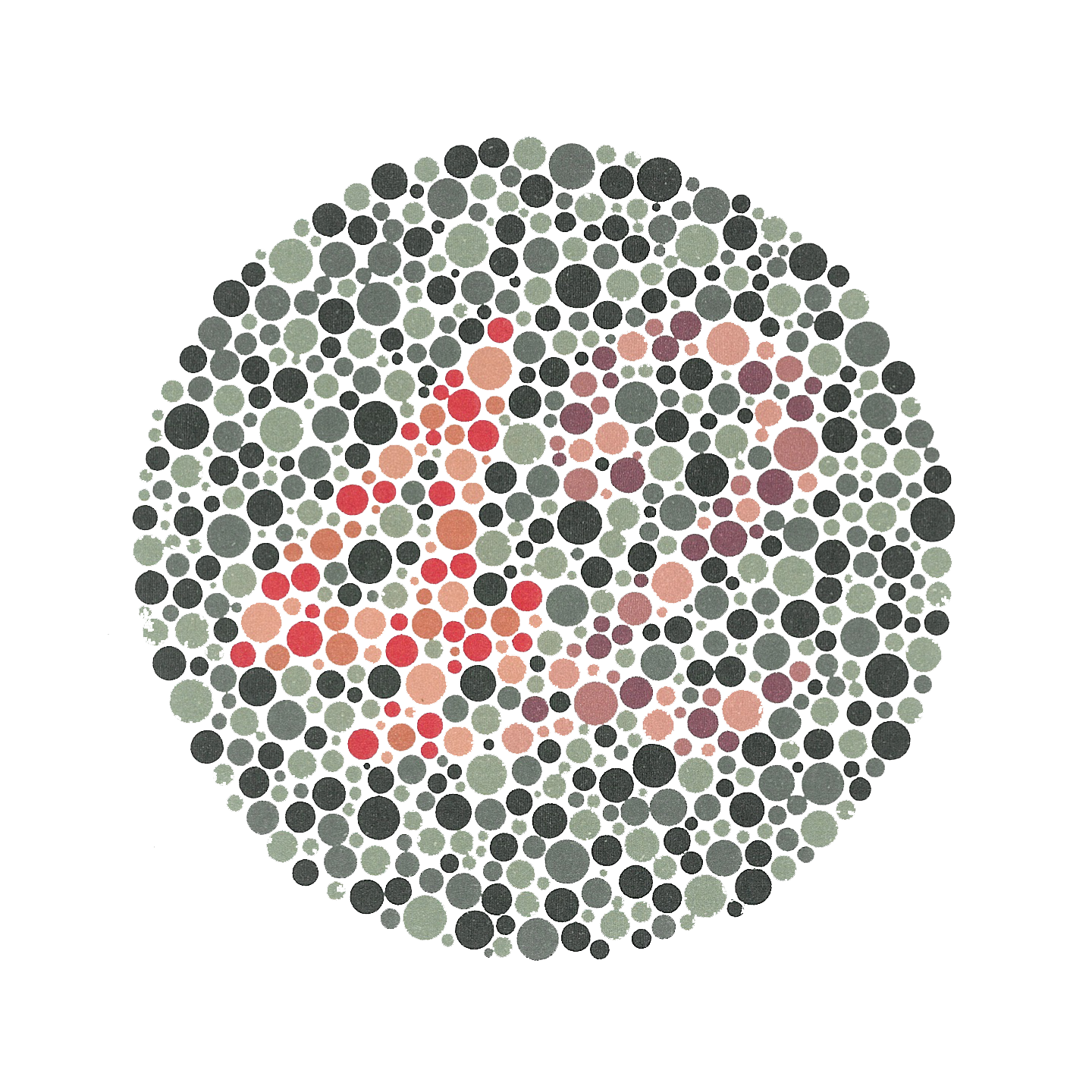
Ishihara Plate 23

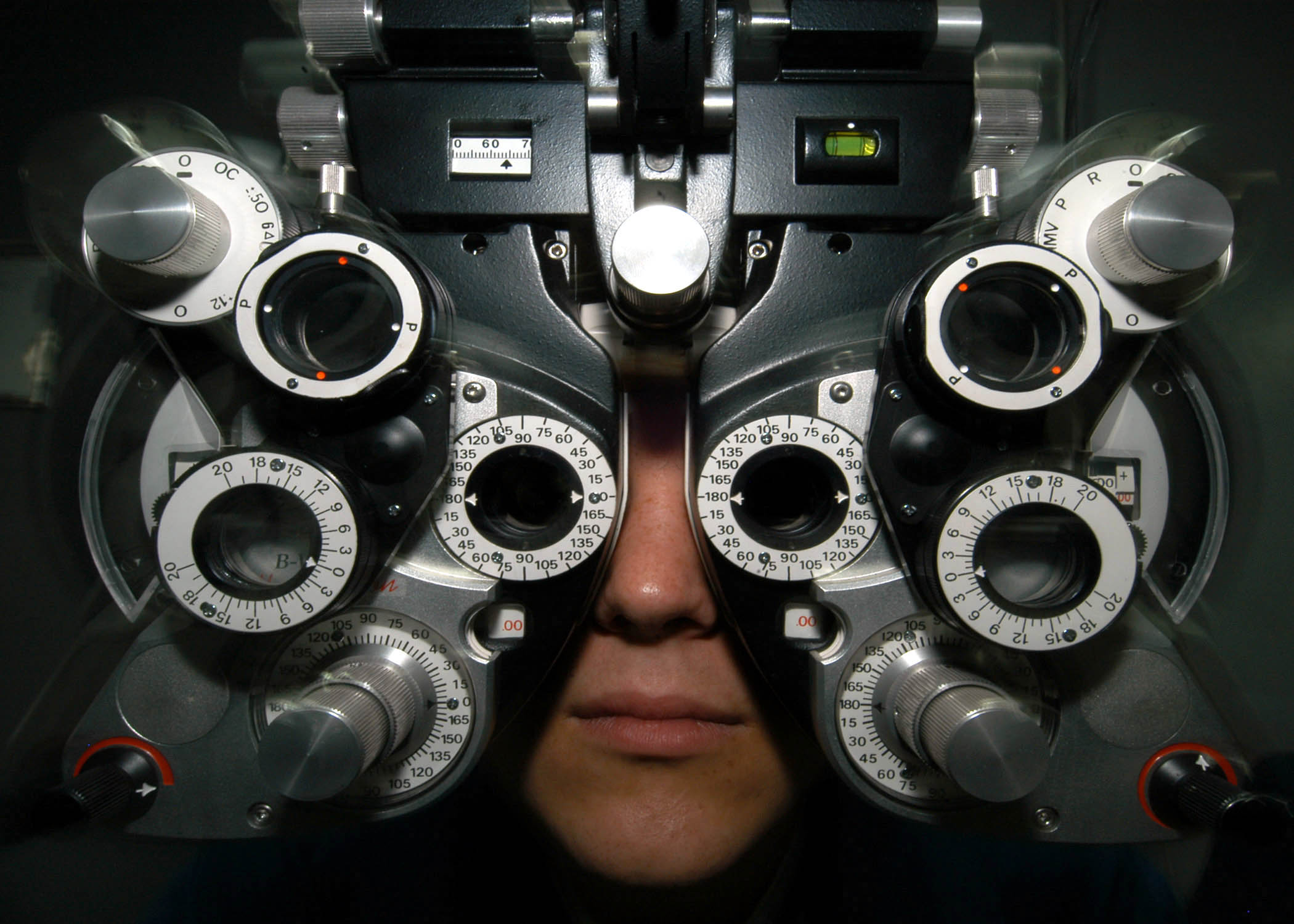
A phoropter

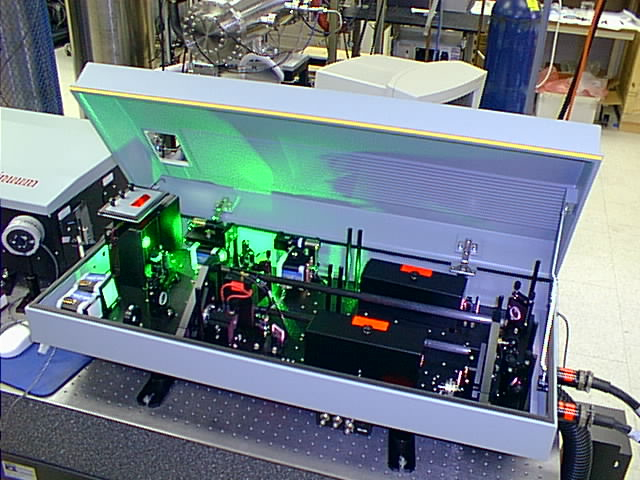
NdYAG Laser

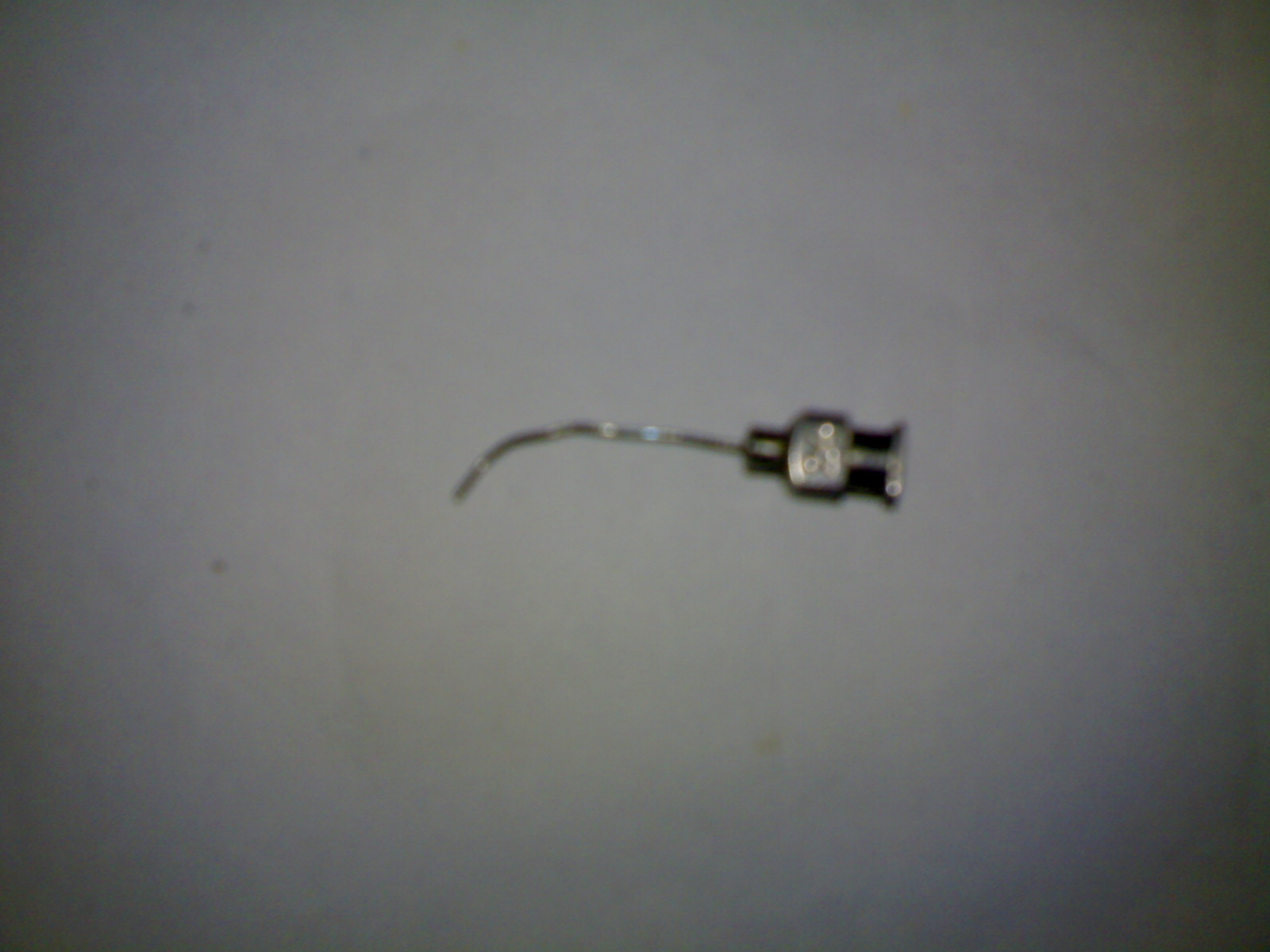
Lacrimal canula
