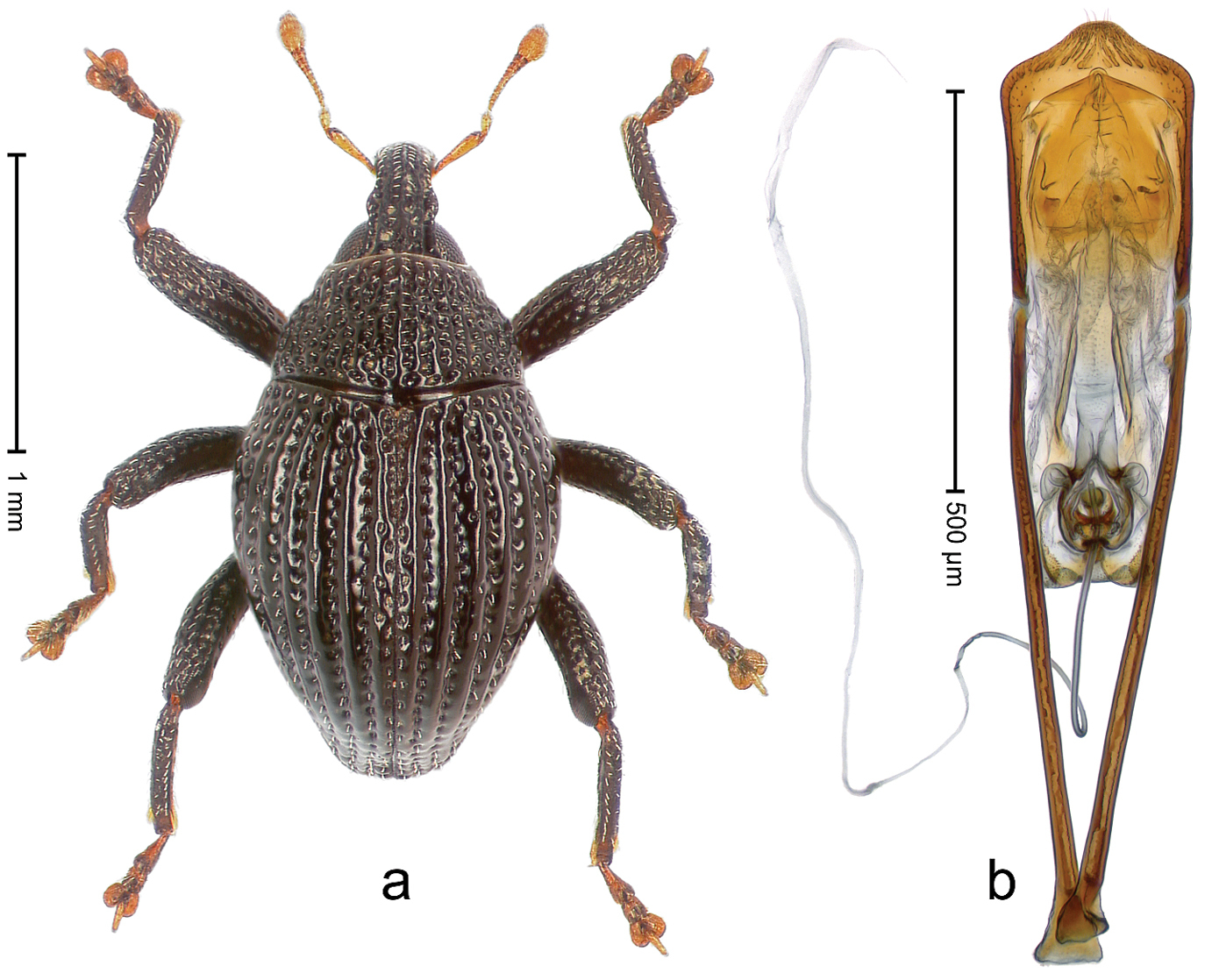

Scientific classification
- Kingdom: Animalia
- Phylum: Arthropoda
- Class: Insecta
- Order: Coleoptera
- Suborder: Polyphaga
- Infraorder: Cucujiformia
- Family: Curculionidae
- Genus: Trigonopterus
- Species: T. dua

Binomial name
- Trigonopterus dua Riedel, 2014

= Trigonopterus dua =

Species of beetle

Trigonopterus dua is a species of flightless weevil in the genus Trigonopterus from Indonesia. The species was first described in 2014 by German coleopterologist Alexander Riedel, in cooperation with entomologists Rene Tenzlerom, Michael Balke, Kahiyo Rakhmadiyev, and Yayyuk Suhardzhono to carry out an audit of the fauna of beetles of the genus Trigonopterus on the island of Java and the neighboring islands. Included in the group of the species Trigonopetrus -group with views trigonopterus aeneomicans, trigonopterus batukarensis, trigonopterus delapan, trigonopterus disruptus, trigonopterus empat, trigonopterus fissitarsis, and other taxa.

== Etymology ==
The specific name is derived from the Indonesian word for "two".

== Description ==
Individuals measure 1.82–1.88 mm in length. The body is slightly oval in shape. General coloration black, with rust-colored tarsi and antennae.

== Range ==
The species is found around elevations of 525–975 metres (1,722–3,199 ft) in Labuan Bajo on the island of Flores, part of the Indonesian province of East Nusa Tenggara.

== Phylogeny ==
T. dua is part of the T. saltator species group.
