= Lacrimal =

The term Lacrimal or lachrymal, may refer to:

== Anatomy ==
- Lacrimal apparatus
- Lacrimal artery
- Lacrimal bone
- Lacrimal canaliculi (singular: canaliculus), also known as Lacrimal ducts
- Lacrimal fossa (disambiguation)
- Lacrimal fluid, see Tears
- Lacrimal gland
- Lacrimal groove, also known as Lacrimal sulcus
- Lacrimal hamulus
- Lacrimal lake
- Lacrimal nerve
- Lacrimal papilla
- Lacrimal punctum
- Lacrimal sac
- Lacrimal secretion, see Tears
- Lacrimal tubercle
- Nasolacrimal duct

== Typography ==
- A type of stroke ending

== See also ==
- Lacrima (disambiguation)
