= Anterior lacrimal crest =

Bony projection of the frontal process of the maxilla

Details
- Part of: maxilla
- System: skeletal

Identifiers
- Latin: crista lacrimalis anterior
- TA98: A02.1.12.025
- TA2: 782
- FMA: 75059

The anterior lacrimal crest is a bony projection on the frontal process of the maxilla. It creates the lateral margin of the lacrimal sac fossa and is continuous with the orbital margin. The medial palpebral ligament is attached to anterior lacrimal crest. It is an important structure to avoid damaging during rhinoplasty.

== Structure ==
The anterior lacrimal crest is a bony projection on the frontal process of the maxilla in the skull. It reaches the junction between the maxilla and the lacrimal bone.

At its junction with the orbital surface is a small tubercle, the lacrimal tubercle, which serves as a guide to the position of the lacrimal sac.

The anterior lacrimal crest is much thicker and stronger than the posterior lacrimal crest. It is one of the thickest parts of the orbit. It is nearly always quite prominent, whilst the posterior lacrimal crest may be less prominent in some people.

=== Relations ===
The lacrimal sac is directly behind the anterior lacrimal crest, which protects it as part of the fossa for the lacrimal sac.

== Function ==
The anterior lacrimal crest is the site of insertion of the medial palpebral ligament. Some consider this a tendon of the orbicularis oris muscle. The anterior lacrimal crest also protects the lacrimal sac.

== Clinical significance ==
=== Avulsion ===
The anterior lacrimal crest may be vulnerable to an avulsion fracture due to its connection to the medial palpebral ligament.

=== Rhinoplasty ===
The anterior lacrimal crest is vulnerable to damage during osteotomy performed during rhinoplasty, a common plastic surgery. It lies approximately 5 mm from the osteotomy incision line.

== See also ==
- Posterior lacrimal crest

== Additional images ==
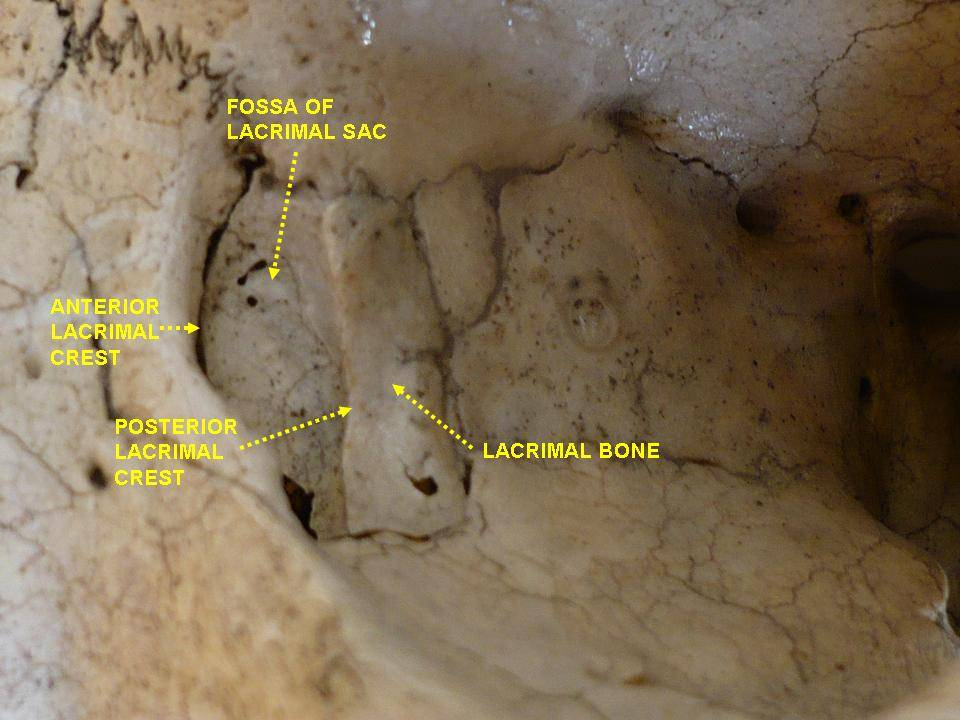
Cranium. Anterior lacrimal crest.Lacrimal bone.
