= Posterior lacrimal crest =

Bony ridge on the orbital surface of the lacrimal bone

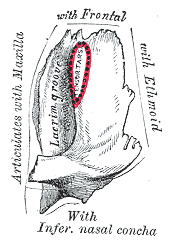
- Left lacrimal bone. Orbital surface. Enlarged. (Posterior lacrimal crest visible but not labeled.)

Details
- Part of: lacrimal bone
- System: skeletal

Identifiers
- Latin: crista lacrimalis posterior
- TA98: A02.1.09.002
- TA2: 745
- FMA: 57609

The posterior lacrimal crest is a vertical bony ridge on the orbital surface of the lacrimal bone. It divides the bone into two parts. It gives origin to the lacrimal part of the orbicularis oculi muscle.

== Structure ==
The posterior lacrimal crest is a vertical bony ridge on the orbital (lateral) surface of the lacrimal bone. It divides the lacrimal bone into two parts. It is quite thin and fragile in most people.

The lacrimal groove is in front of this crest. The inner margin of it unites with the frontal process of the maxilla to complete the fossa for the lacrimal sac. The portion of the lacrimal bone behind the posterior lacrimal crest is smooth, and forms part of the medial wall of the orbit. The lacrimal crest ends below in the lacrimal hamulus (a small hook-like projection), which articulates with the lacrimal tubercle of the maxilla.

=== Relations ===
The posterior lacrimal crest is just behind the lacrimal sac, and its upper part lodges the lacrimal sac. The lower part lodges the nasolacrimal duct. Horner's muscle, part of the orbicularis oris muscle, inserts between 2 mm and 4 mm from the posterior lacrimal crest. Together with the thicker and more prominent anterior lacrimal crest, it forms the fossa for the lacrimal sac.

=== Variation ===
In most people, the posterior lacrimal crest is fairly prominent. However, in around 20% of people, it is fairly shallow. In contrast, the anterior lacrimal crest is almost always very prominent.

== Function ==
The posterior lacrimal crest gives origin to the lacrimal part of the orbicularis oculi muscle. It also helps to protect the lacrimal sac.

== Clinical significance ==
The posterior lacrimal crest may be vulnerable to avulsion fractures. It is generally quite thin and fragile. 25% of such avulsion fractures are related to a Le Fort III skull fracture.

== Additional images ==
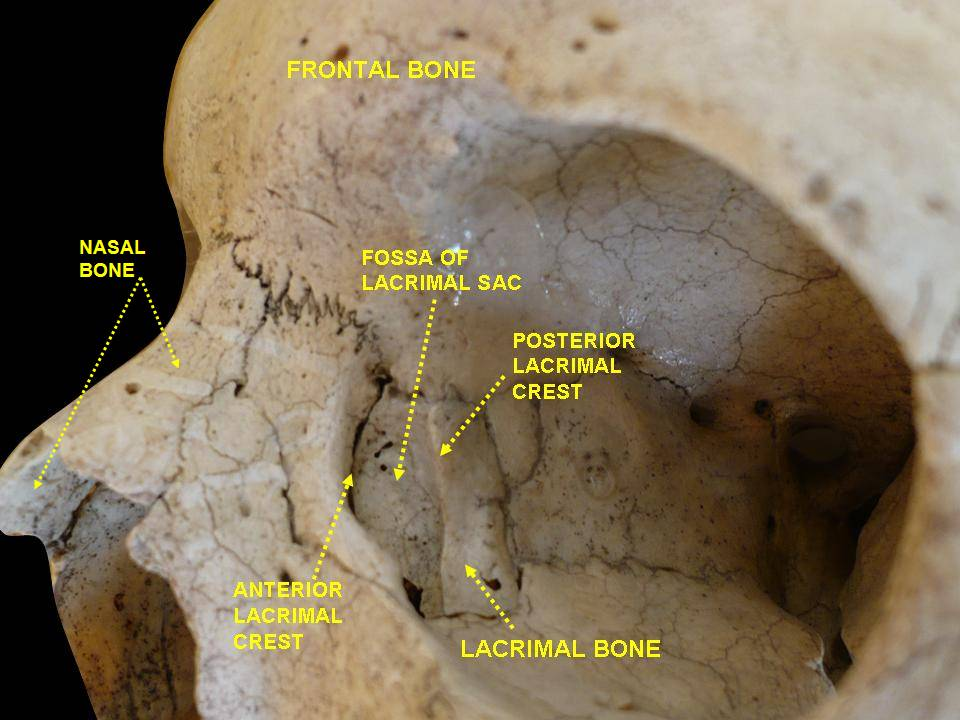
Cranium. Posterior lacrimal crest. Lacrimal bone.

== See also ==
- Anterior lacrimal crest
