= Epicanthic fold =

Skin fold of the upper eyelid

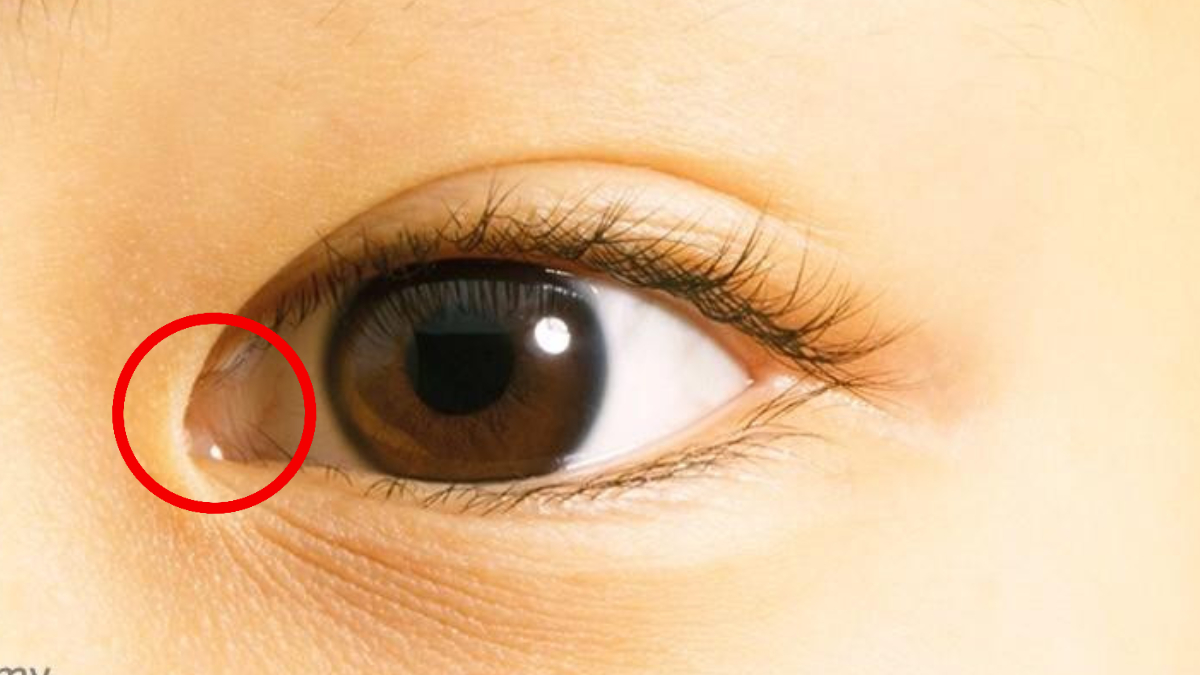
- This image highlights the epicanthic folds

Details
- Synonyms: Epicanthal fold, epicanthus, eye fold, Mongoloid fold, palpebronasal fold
- Pronunciation: /ˌɛpɪˌkænθɪk ˈfoʊld/

Identifiers
- Latin: plica palpebronasalis
- TA98: A15.2.07.028
- TA2: 211
- FMA: 59370

An epicanthic fold or epicanthus (/ˌɛpɪˈkænθəs/) is a vertical fold of skin on either side of the nose, sometimes covering the inner canthus (medial canthus) of the eye. However, variation occurs in the nature of this feature and the presence of "partial epicanthic folds" or "slight epicanthic folds" is noted in the relevant literature. Various factors influence whether epicanthic folds form, including ancestry, age, and certain medical conditions.

The primary cause of the epicanthic fold is the hypertrophy of the preseptal (anterior to the orbital septum) portion of the orbicularis oculi muscle.

== Etymology ==
Epicanthus means 'above the canthus', with epi-canthus being the Latinised form of the Ancient Greek ἐπί κανθός: 'corner of the eye'.

== Classification ==
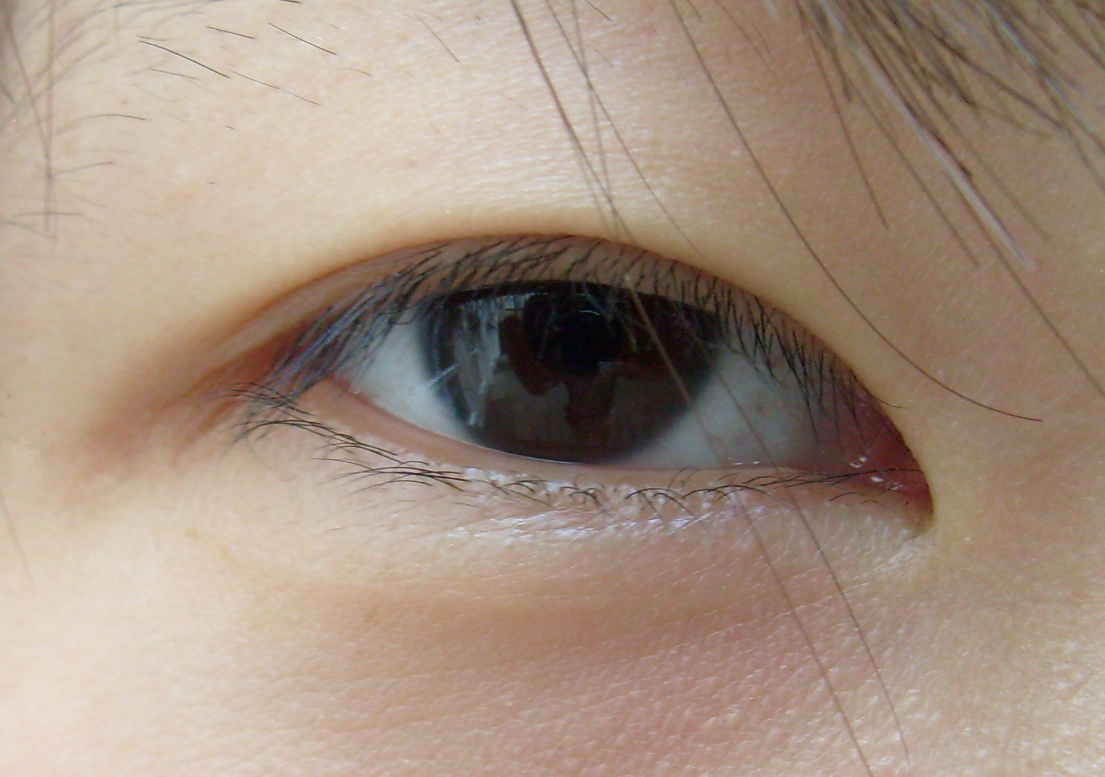
A Korean girl with the skin fold of the upper eyelid covering the inner angle of the eye

Variation in the shape of the epicanthic fold has led to four types being recognised:

- Epicanthus supraciliaris runs from the brow, curving downwards towards the lachrymal sac.
- Epicanthus palpebralis begins above the upper tarsus and extends to the inferior orbital rim.
- Epicanthus tarsalis originates at the upper eyelid crease and merges into the skin near the medial canthus. This is the type most often found in East Asians.
- Epicanthus inversus runs from the lower eyelid skin over the medial canthus and extends to the upper lid.

== Ethnogeographic distribution ==
=== High-frequency populations ===
The highest frequency of occurrence of epicanthic folds is found in specific populations or ethnicities: East Asians, Southeast Asians, Central Asians, North Asians, Polynesians, Micronesians, Indigenous peoples of the Americas, Sámi people and some African people (especially among Khoisan and Nilotic people). Among South Asians, they occur at very high frequencies among the Nepalis, Bhutanese, Northeast Indians, Kirati people and certain Adivasi tribes of Eastern and Southern India. It is also commonly found in Northern India, especially in Kashmir. It is also quite common among people in Bangladesh. The Hazara people in Afghanistan and Pakistan commonly have this trait.

In some of these populations, the trait is almost universal. This is especially true in Japan and South Korea, where a majority, up to 90% in some estimations, of adults naturally have this feature.

=== Lower-frequency populations ===
Epicanthic folds also occur, at a considerably lower frequency, in other populations: Europeans (e.g., Scandinavians, English, Irish, Hungarians, Russians, Poles, Lithuanians, Latvians, and Estonians), Jews, South Asians (Bengalis, Sinhalese, among other groups in eastern and southern South Asia), Nilotes, Cushites, and Amazigh people.

=== Perception and attribution ===
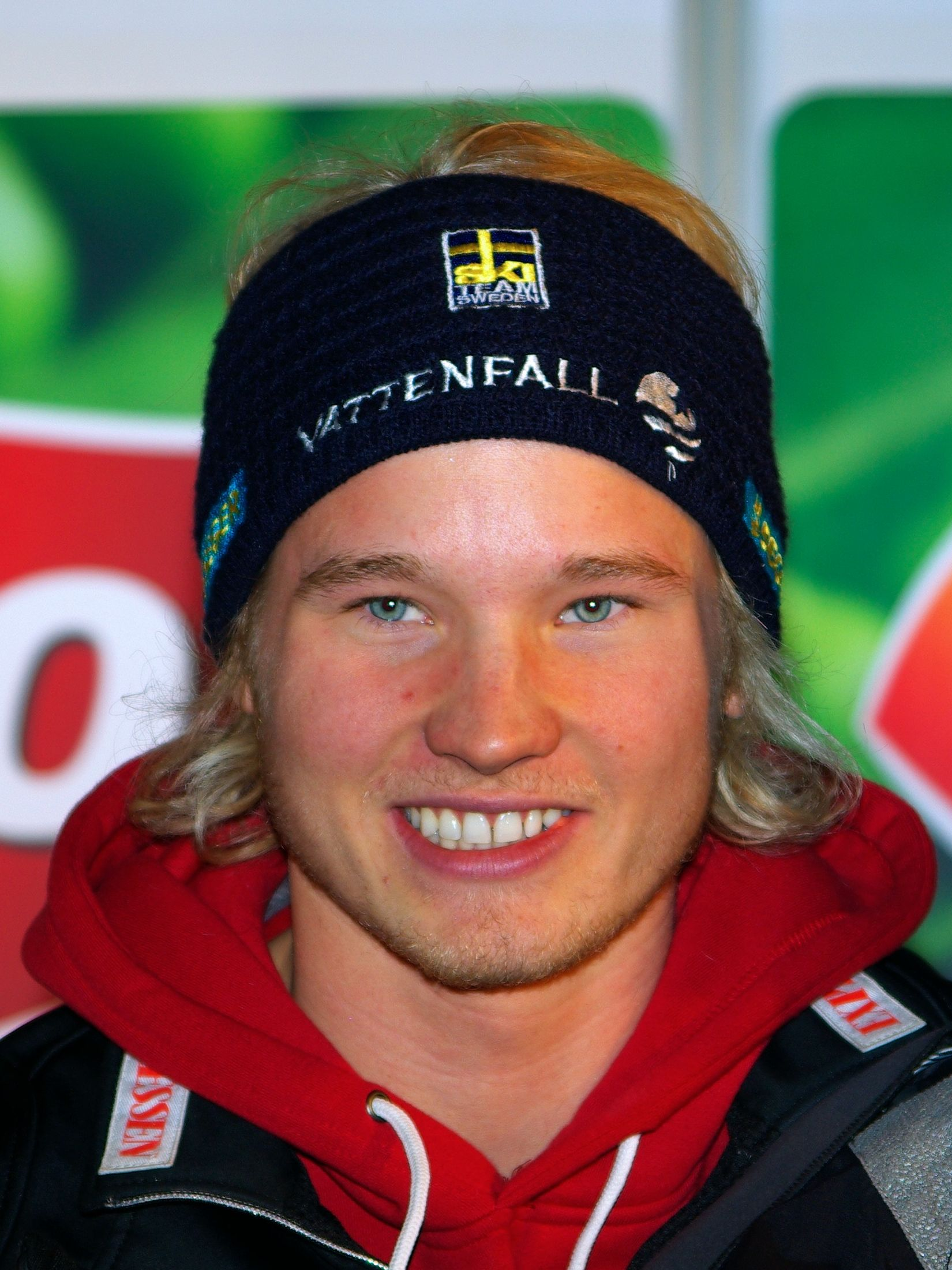
Swedish (with some Sámi roots) ski racer Jens Byggmark with an epicanthic fold over his left eye

The degree of development of the fold between individuals varies greatly, and attribution of its presence or absence is often subjective, being to a degree relative to the occurrence of the trait within the community of the specific observer. Also, its frequency varies but can be found in peoples all over the world. Its use, therefore, as a phenotypic marker to define biological populations is debatable.

== Possible evolutionary function ==
The epicanthic fold is often associated with greater levels of fat deposition around the eyeball. The adipose tissue is thought to provide greater insulation for the eye and sinuses from the effects of cold, especially from freezing winds, and to represent an adaptation to cold climates. It has also been postulated that the fold itself may provide a level of protection from snow blindness. Though its appearance in peoples of Southeast Asia can be linked to possible descent from cold-adapted ancestors, this does not explain its occurrence in various African peoples. The epicanthic fold found in many African people has been tentatively linked to protection for the eye from the high levels of ultraviolet light found in desert and semi-desert areas.

The exact evolutionary function and origin of epicanthic folds remains unknown. Scientific explanations include either random variation and selection (presumably sexual selection), or possible adaption to desert environment and/or high levels of ultraviolet light found in high-altitude environments, such as the Himalayas.

Frank Poirier, a physical anthropologist at Ohio State University, said that the epicanthic fold among Asian people is often explained as part of an adaptation to severe cold or tropical environments; however, he suggests that neither of these explanations are sufficient to explain its presence in East and Southeast Asia, and notes that the fold can also be observed in Irish and African people. He attributes the epicanthic fold to pleiotropic genes that control more than one characteristic or function. He also did not offer an explanation for the origin of epicanthic folds.

== Other factors ==
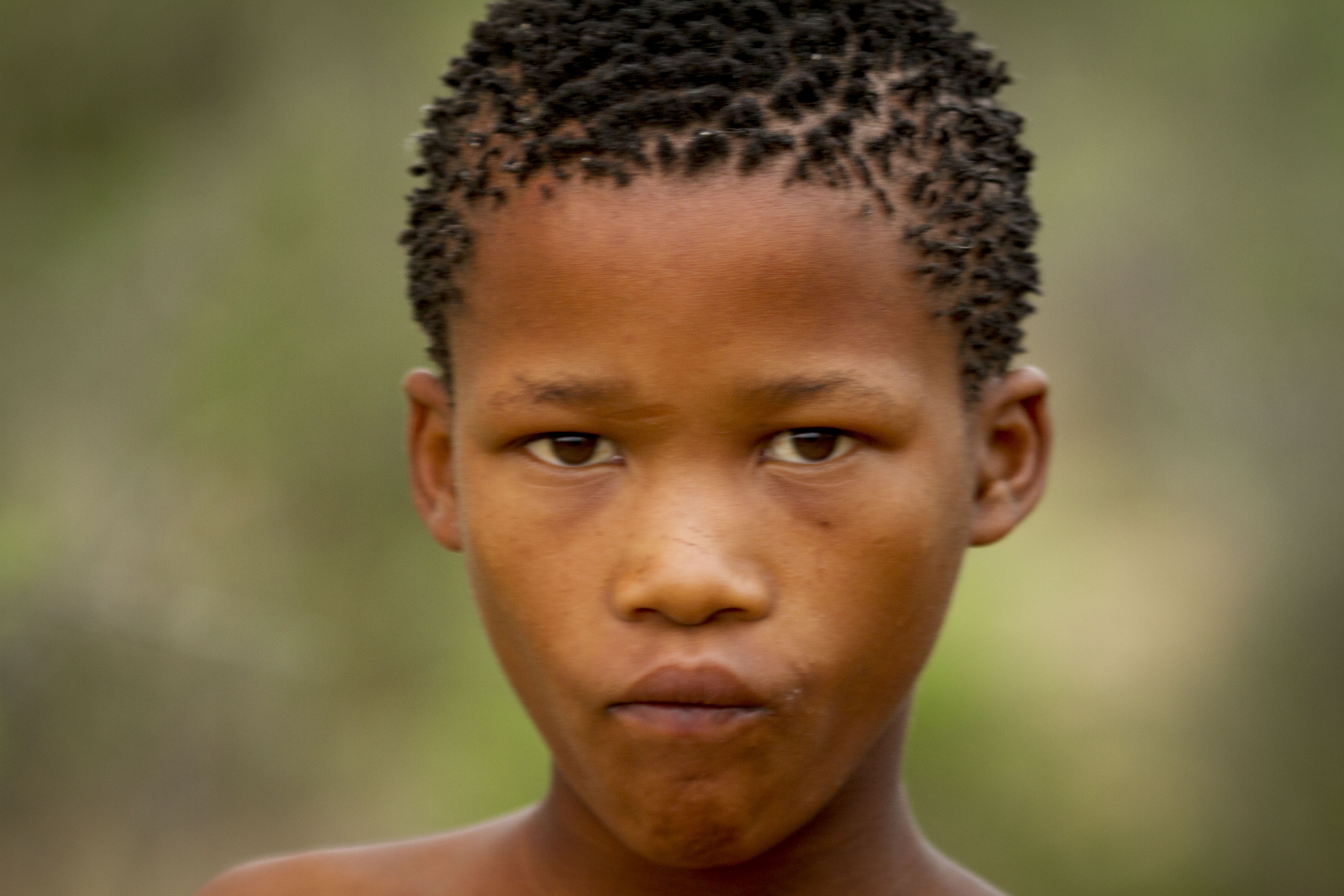
The Khoekhoe, the San and some other African groups have a high frequency of the epicanthic fold.

=== Age ===
Many foetuses lose their epicanthic folds after three to six months of gestation. Epicanthic folds may be visible in the development stages of young children of any ethnicity, especially before the nose bridge fully develops.

=== Medical conditions ===
Epicanthic fold prevalence can sometimes be found as a sign of congenital abnormality, such as in Zellweger syndrome and Noonan syndrome. Medical conditions that cause the nasal bridge not to develop and project are also associated with epicanthic fold. About 60% of individuals with Down syndrome (also known as trisomy 21) have prominent epicanthic folds.

Other examples are fetal alcohol syndrome, phenylketonuria, and Turner syndrome.

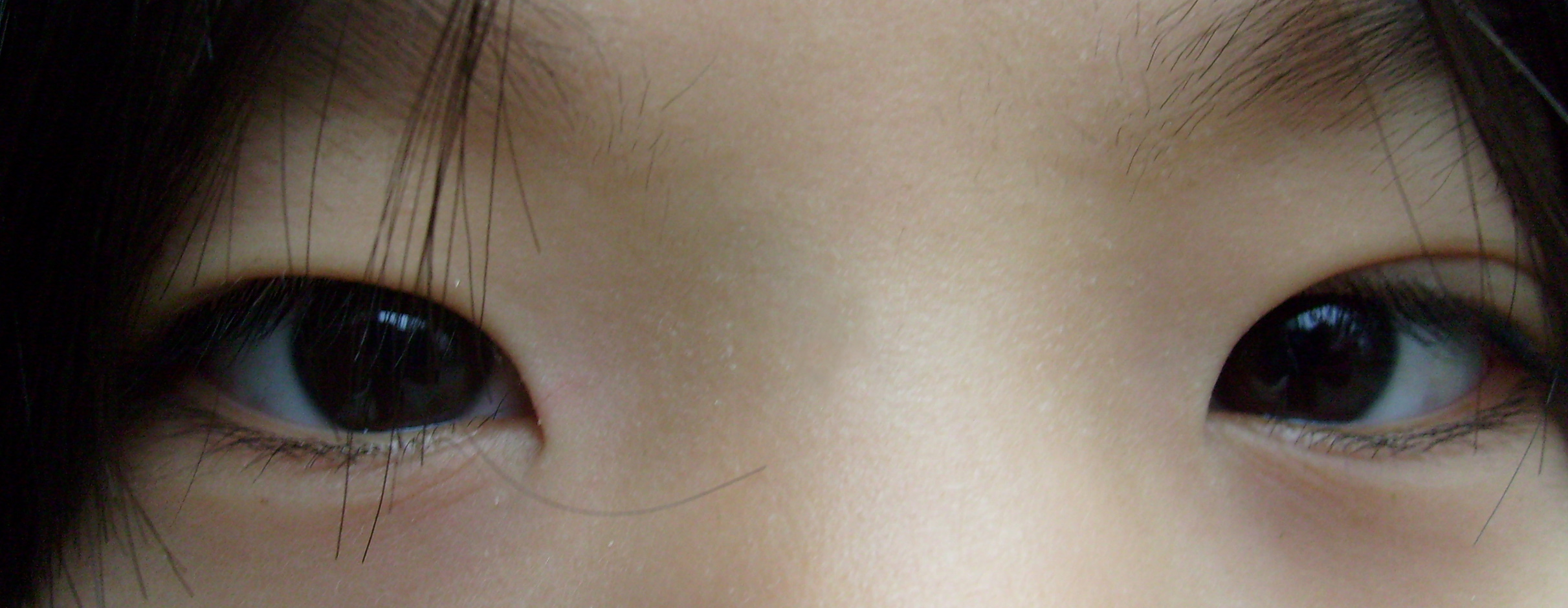
Epicanthic folds. Note that the tarsal plates are exposed laterally.

== Misclassification of monolids and epicanthic folds ==
Monolids and epicanthic folds are often used interchangeably, but they refer to different eyelid types. Monolids are characterised by the absence of an upper eyelid crease, with the tarsal plates being obscured. In contrast, epicanthic folds are defined by the presence of excess upper eyelid skin that forms a curve over the inner corners of the eyes, while the tarsal plates remain exposed completely or laterally.

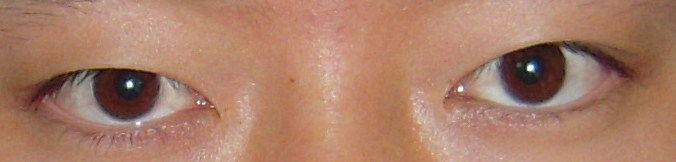
In monolids, the tarsal plate is barely or not at all visible.)

== See also ==
- Blepharitis
- Epicanthoplasty, the surgical modification of epicanthic folds
- Human physical appearance
