= Medial palpebral ligament =

Ligament connecting the maxilla and the lacrimal bone to the eyelids

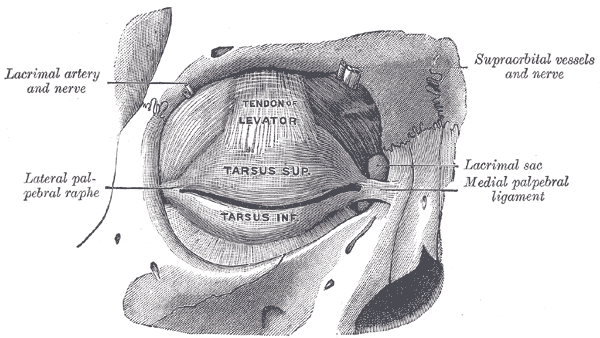
- The tarsi and their ligaments. Right eye; front view.

Details
- Origin: Frontal process of the maxilla, lacrimal bone
- Insertion: Tarsus of the upper and lower eyelids
- Artery: Medial palpebral artery

Identifiers
- Latin: ligamentum palpebrale mediale, tendo oculi
- TA98: A15.2.07.041
- TA2: 6832
- FMA: 323068

The medial palpebral ligament (medial canthal tendon) is a ligament of the face. It attaches to the frontal process of the maxilla, the lacrimal groove, and the tarsus of each eyelid. It has a superficial (anterior) and a deep (posterior) layer, with many surrounding attachments. It connects the medial canthus of each eyelid to the medial part of the orbit. It is a useful point of fixation during eyelid reconstructive surgery.

== Structure ==
The anterior attachment of the medial palpebral ligament is to the frontal process of the maxilla in front of the lacrimal groove (near the nasal bone and the frontal bone), and its posterior attachment is the lacrimal bone. Crossing the lacrimal sac, it divides into two parts, upper and lower, each attached to the medial end of the corresponding tarsus of each eyelid.

As the ligament crosses the lacrimal sac, a strong aponeurotic lamina is given off from its posterior surface; this expands over the sac, and is attached to the posterior lacrimal crest.

The medial palpebral ligament consists of a superficial (anterior) and a deep (posterior) layer. The superficial layer has a length of around 9.6 mm, a width of around 2.4 mm, and a thickness of around 4.5 mm. The deep layer has a length of around 3.7, a width of around 2.9, and a thickness of around 0.3 mm. Together, these have a strength of around 17 newtons, with most of this strength from the superficial layer.

=== Relations ===
The superior branch of the medial palpebral artery runs directly behind the medial palpebral ligament. Branches of the facial nerve, particularly the buccal branches, pass upwards over the medial palpebral ligament to reach the nose.

== Function ==
The medial palpebral ligament connects the medial canthus of each eyelid to the medial part of the orbit.

== Clinical significance ==
The medial palpebral ligament can be used as a point of fixation during eyelid reconstructive surgery, allowing for normal blinking.

== History ==
The medial palpebral ligament has also been known as the medial canthal tendon. Some consider it to be a tendon of the lacrimal part of the orbicularis oculi muscle.

== See also ==
- Orbicularis oculi muscle
