= Lacrima =

Lacrima is the Latin word for tear. It may refer to:

- Lacrima, a genus of lichen-forming fungi
- Lacrima (grape), a rare red wine grape variety native to the Marche region of Italy
- Asprinio Bianco or Lacrima, a white Italian wine grape variety grown primarily in southwest Italy around the Naples region of Campania
- Lacrima Christi, an Italian wine produced in the Campania region of Italy
- Lacrima Dairy, a Bulgarian dairy producer

== See also ==
- Lacrimal (disambiguation)
