= Lateral palpebral raphe =

Ligamentous band at the lateral edge of the eyelids

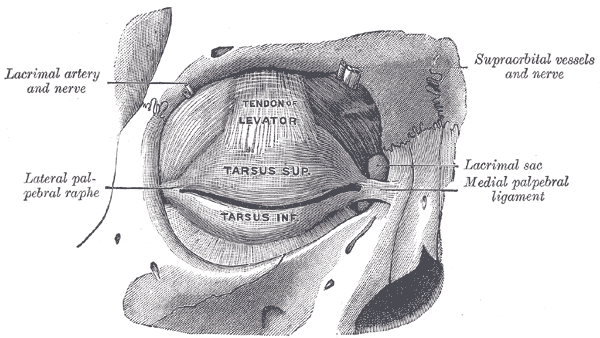
- The tarsi and their ligaments. Right eye; front view.

Details
- Precursor: orbicularis oculi muscle

Identifiers
- Latin: raphe palpebralis lateralis

The lateral palpebral raphe is a ligamentous band near the eye. Its existence is contentious, and many sources describe it as the continuation of nearby muscles. It is formed from the lateral ends of the orbicularis oculi muscle. It connects the orbicularis oculi muscle, the frontosphenoidal process of the zygomatic bone, and the tarsi of the eyelids.

== Structure ==
The lateral palpebral raphe is formed from the lateral ends of the orbicularis oculi muscle. It may also be formed from the pretarsal muscles of the eyelids. It is attached to the margin of the frontosphenoidal process of the zygomatic bone. It passes towards the midline to the lateral commissure of the eyelids. Here, it divides into two slips, which are attached to the margins of the respective tarsi of the eyelids.

The lateral palpebral ligament has a tensile strength of around 12 newtons.

=== Relations ===
The lateral palpebral raphe is a much weaker structure than the medial palpebral ligament on the other side of the eyelids.

=== Variation ===
The lateral palpebral raphe may be absent in some people. If it is not present, it is replaced with muscular fibres of orbicularis oculi muscle. It is often very hard to identify as a distinct anatomical feature. Some sources claim that it does not exist.

== See also ==
- Orbicularis oculi muscle
- Lateral palpebral commissure
