= Samuel Ernest Whitnall =

English doctor, anatomist and humorist (1876–1950)

- Born: March 30, 1876; England
- Died: February 19, 1950 (aged 73)
- Occupations: Doctor; anatomist; humorist
- Known for: Parody of medical guides
- Medical career
- Profession: Medicine
- Field: Anatomy
- Institutions: Oxford University; Royal College of Physicians; McGill University

Samuel Ernest Whitnall (30 March 1876 – 19 February 1950) was an English doctor, anatomist and humorist. He is known for his work on orbital anatomy, having described the Whitnall ligament and the Whitnall tubercle. He was also distinguished for writing one of only known examples from the era of a parody of medical guides for students.

Whitnall earned his doctorate at Oxford. He worked there from 1908 to 1919 as demonstrator of anatomy, eventually joining the Royal College of Physicians, London. He later taught at McGill University as a professor of anatomy.

== Selected works ==
- Astonishing Anatomy (published under the pseudonym "Tingle" in 1913)
- The anatomy of the human orbit and accessory organs of vision (Hodder & Staughton, 1921)
- The Study of Anatomy (Williams & Wilkins Co, 1939)
