= Frontal process =

Frontal process may refer to:

- Frontal process of maxilla, a plate which forms part of the lateral boundary of the nose
- Frontal process of the zygomatic bone, forms the anterior lateral orbital wall
