= Lacrimal hamulus =

Small, hook-like bony projection of the lacrimal bone

Details
- Part of: lacrimal bone
- System: skeletal

Identifiers
- Latin: hamulus lacrimalis
- TA98: A02.1.09.004
- TA2: 747
- FMA: 57606

The lacrimal hamulus is a small, hook-like bony projection of the lacrimal bone. It is a continuation of the posterior lacrimal crest. It articulates with the lacrimal tubercle of the maxilla, and completes the upper orifice of the lacrimal canaliculus. It sometimes exists as a separate piece, and is then called the lesser lacrimal bone.

== Structure ==
The lacrimal hamulus is a small, hook-like bony projection of the lacrimal bone. It is a continuation of the posterior lacrimal crest of the lacrimal bone. It articulates with the lacrimal tubercle of the maxilla. This completes the upper orifice of the lacrimal canaliculus.

=== Relations ===
The lacrimal hamulus is usually around 9 mm from the infraorbital foramen, around 20 mm from the inferior orbital fissure, and around 31 mm from the beginning of the posterior lacrimal crest.

=== Variation ===
The lacrimal hamulus develops from its own site of primary ossification of cartilage. Because of this, it sometimes exists as a separate piece, and is then called the lesser lacrimal bone.

== See also ==
- Hamulus
