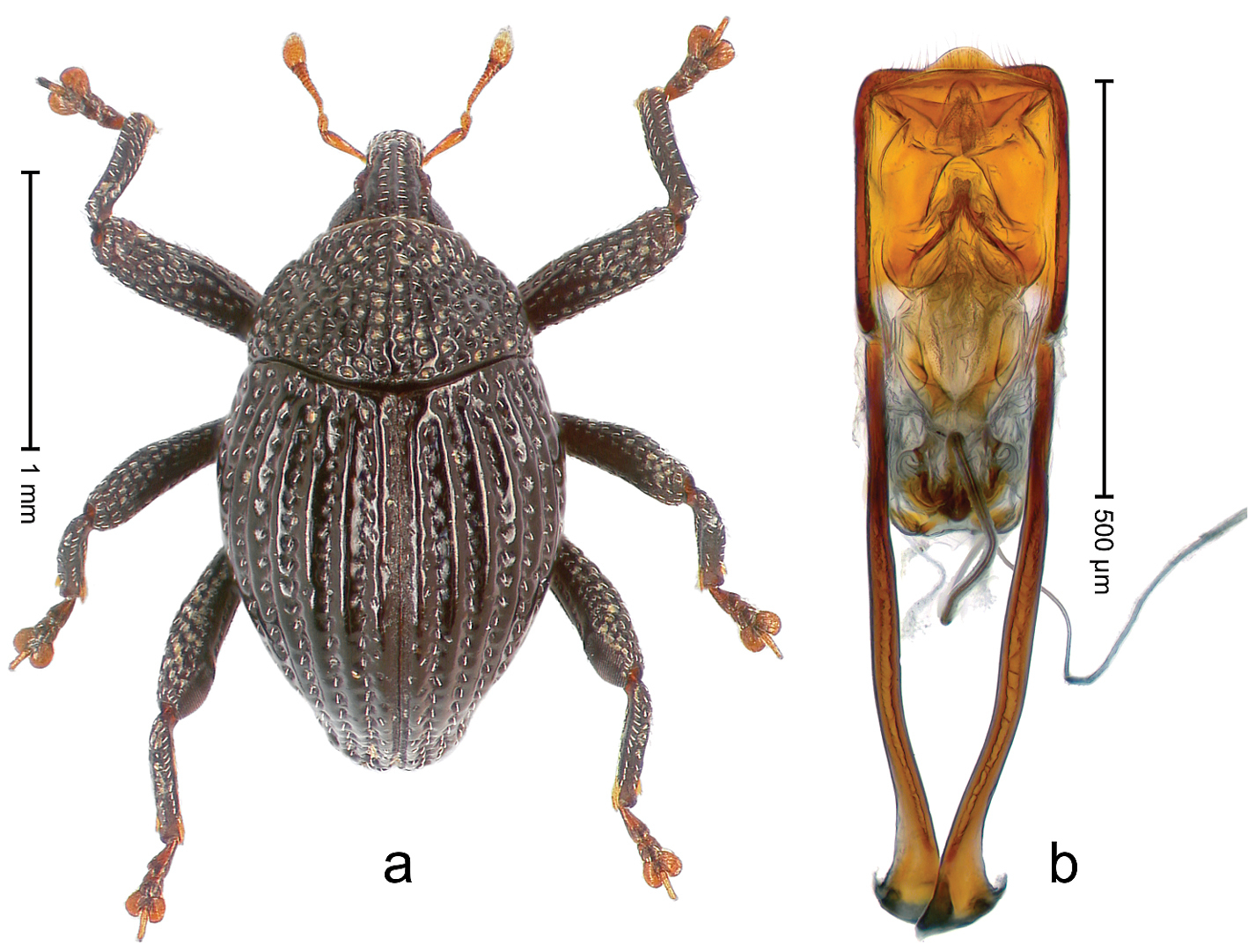

Scientific classification
- Kingdom: Animalia
- Phylum: Arthropoda
- Class: Insecta
- Order: Coleoptera
- Suborder: Polyphaga
- Infraorder: Cucujiformia
- Family: Curculionidae
- Genus: Trigonopterus
- Species: T. delapan

Binomial name
- Trigonopterus delapan Riedel, 2014

= Trigonopterus delapan =

Species of beetle

Trigonopterus delapan is a species of flightless weevil in the genus Trigonopterus from Indonesia.

== Etymology ==
The specific name is derived the Indonesian word for "eight".

== Description ==
Individuals measure 2.04–2.08 mm in length. Body shape is slightly ovate. General coloration is black, with rust-colored tarsi and antennae.

== Range ==
The species is found at an elevation of 525 metres (1,722 ft) in Labuan Bajo on the island of Flores, part of the Indonesian province of East Nusa Tenggara.

== Phylogeny ==
T. delapan is part of the T. saltator species group.
