= Canthus =

Corner of the eye where the upper and lower eyelids meet

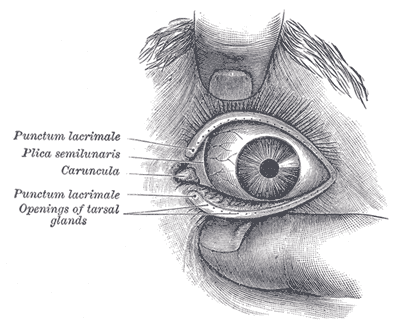
- Front of left eye with eyelids separated to show medial canthus.

Identifiers
- FMA: 59222

The canthus (pl.: canthi, palpebral commissures) is either corner of the eye where the upper and lower eyelids meet. More specifically, the inner and outer canthi are, respectively, the medial and lateral ends/angles of the palpebral fissure.

The bicanthal plane is the transversal plane linking both canthi and defines the upper boundary of the midface.

== Etymology ==
The word canthus is the Latinized form of the Ancient Greek κανθός (kanthós), meaning 'corner of the eye'.

== Population distribution ==
The eyes of East Asian and some Southeast Asian people tend to have the inner canthus veiled by the epicanthus. In the Caucasian or double eyelid, the inner corner tends to be exposed completely.

== Commissures ==
- The lateral palpebral commissure (commissura palpebrarum lateralis; external canthus) is more acute than the medial, and the eyelids here lie in close contact with the bulb of the eye.
- The medial palpebral commissure (commissura palpebrarum medialis; internal canthus) is prolonged for a short distance toward the nose, and the two eyelids are separated by a triangular space, the lacus lacrimalis.

== Surgery ==
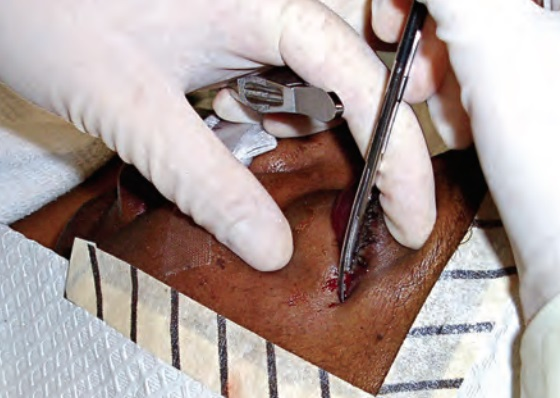
Cutting lateral canthus

Canthoplasty refers to a plastic surgery of the medial and/or lateral canthus. This technique is common in cosmetic procedures, as well as procedures that address eyelid function or malposition.

A canthotomy involves cutting the canthus, often performed to release excessive orbital pressure (i.e., from orbital hemorrhage or infection).

The two canthi of each eye (medial and lateral, that is, inner and outer) are represented in cephalometric analysis by the endocanthion and exocanthion landmarks (single points representing the point of each commissural angle).

== Pathology ==
Telecanthus, or dystopia canthorum, is a lateral displacement of the inner canthi of the eyes, giving an appearance of a widened nasal bridge. It is associated with Waardenburg syndrome, which is due to mutation in PAX gene.

== See also ==
- Anatomy
- Biological morphology
- Commissure
- Epicanthic fold
- Fissure (anatomy)
- Lateral palpebral raphe
