= Superior transverse ligament =

Ligament of the eye

The superior transverse ligament of the eye (also known as Whitnall's ligament) is a transverse ligament surrounding the levator palpebrae superioris muscle close to its partial implantation into the skin of the upper eyelid. The muscle also attaches to the superior tarsal plate and into orbital bone.

The ligament allows for a change of the functional origin of the levator palpebrae superioris muscle, enabling the superior tarsus (eyelid) to be elevated superiorly rather than directly toward the muscle's origin on the sphenoid bone. Attaches medially to the pulley of superior oblique muscle (Trochlea of superior oblique) and laterally to the lacrimal gland 10mm above Whitnall tubercle. So it is not attached to the lateral orbital tubercle of Whitnall.
