= Hamulus =

Hooklet-like structure in biology

A hamus or hamulus is a structure functioning as, or in the form of, hooks or hooklets.

== Etymology ==
The terms are directly from Latin, in which hamus means "hook". The plural is hami.

Hamulus is the diminutive – a hooklet or little hook. The plural is hamuli.

Adjectives are hamate and hamulate, as in "a hamulate wing-coupling", in which the wings of certain insects in flight are joined by hooking hamuli on one wing into folds on a matching wing. Hamulate can also mean "having hamuli". The terms hamose, hamular, hamous and hamiform also have been used to mean "hooked", or "hook-shaped". Terms such as hamate that do not indicate a diminutive usually refer particularly to a hook at the tip, whereas diminutive terms such as hamulose tend to imply that something is beset with small hooks.

== Anatomy ==
Human left hand with hamulus of hamate bone shown in red

In vertebrate anatomy, a hamulus is a small, hook-shaped portion of a bone, or possibly other hard tissue.

In human anatomy, examples include:

- pterygoid hamulus
- hamulus of hamate bone
- lacrimal hamulus

== Arthropoda ==
In arthropod morphology, hamuli are hooklets, usually in the form of projections of the surface of the exoskeleton. Hamuli might be actual evaginations of the whole thickness of the exoskeleton. The best-known examples are probably the row of hamuli on the anterior edge of the metathoracic (rear) wings of Hymenoptera such as the honeybee. The hooks attach to a fold on the posterior edge of the mesothoracic (front) wings.

It is less widely realised that similar hamuli, though usually fewer, are used in wing coupling in the Sternorrhyncha, the suborder of aphids and scale insects. In the Sternorrhyncha such wing coupling occurs particularly in the males of some species. The rear wings of that suborder frequently are reduced or absent, and in many species the last vestige of the rear wing to persist is a vestigial little strap holding the hamuli, still hooking into the fold of the large front wings.

In those springtails (Collembola) that have a functional furcula, the underside of the third abdominal segment bears a hooked structure, variously called the retinaculum or hamulus. It holds the furcula ready for release in times of emergency.

The terms also are used in descriptive anatomy of some insect genitalia, such as hamuli in various Odonata and "hamus" for the hooked part of the uncus in male Lepidoptera.

== Botany ==
In botany, such words largely refer to hooked bristles such as the hooks on the rachilla of Uncinia, which attach the fruit to passing animals, or the similarly functioning hooks on Burdocks, well known as the alleged inspiration for Velcro.
