= Agger nasi =

Anatomical feature of the nose

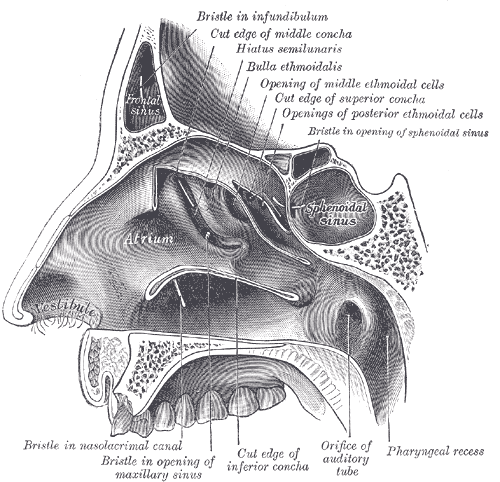
- Lateral wall of nasal cavity; the three nasal conchæ have been removed.

Details

Identifiers
- Latin: agger nasi
- TA98: A06.1.02.021
- TA2: 3145
- FMA: 59766

The agger nasi (from Latin: agger meaning "mound or heap") is a small ridge on the lateral side of the nasal cavity. It is located midway at the anterior edge of the middle nasal concha, directly above the atrium of the middle meatus. It is formed by a mucous membrane covering the ethmoidal crest of the maxilla.

It is also called the nasoturbinal concha or the nasal ridge. In 90% of patients an anterior ethmoidal cell (called the "agger nasi cell") can be found in the lacrimal bone below the agger nasi ridge. An enlarged agger nasi cell may encroach the frontal recess area, constricting it and causing mechanical obstruction to frontal sinus drainage. The agger nasi cell may be removed during sinus surgery to open an obstructed frontal sinus drainage pathway.

== Bibliography ==
- "Agger nasi", Stedman's Medical Dictionary, 27th ed. (2000). ISBN 0-683-40007-X
