= Lacrima (company) =

Lacrima Dairy Industry Company

Lacrima Dairy Industry Ltd.
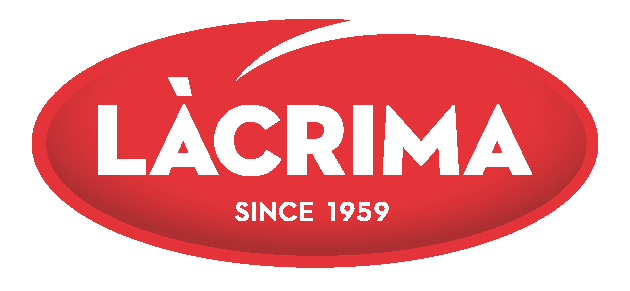
- Company type: private sector
- Industry: Food processing
- Founded: 1959
- Headquarters: Bulgaria Pazardzhik
- Area served: International
- Key people: Muhanned Al-Nuaimi (Chairman); Sara Al-Nuaimi (CEO); Hussein Al-Baz (CFO)
- Revenue: Private Sector not corporation
- Owner: Euro investment Holding JSC
- Number of employees: 250
- Website: https://www.lacrimadairy.com/

Lacrima (stylized as LÀCRIMA) is a Bulgarian dairy producer, founded in 1959 and headquartered in Pazardzhik, a city in southern Bulgaria. It specializes in the production of traditional Bulgarian cheeses, including white brine cheese and yellow cheese. The company’s production facility, located near the Rhodope Mountains, occupies a site spanning 19,500 m^{2} (210,000 sq ft).

== History and Production ==
Lacrima Dairy utilizes traditional Bulgarian cheese-making methods in its production processes. The company sources milk domestically and employs bacterial cultures consistent with regional practices. During production, raw materials and bacterial strains undergo laboratory analysis, and finished products are inspected through multiple quality control stages.

== Achievements ==
In 2014, Lacrima Dairy’s cheese products were awarded two gold medals at the International Food Fair "The World of Milk", held in Sofia, Bulgaria.

== Locations ==
Lacrima Dairy has facilities in both Jordan and Bulgaria. The Jordan facility is located in Zarqa Freezone, while the Bulgarian facility is situated in the Southern Industrial Zone of Pazardzhik.

== Awards and Recognitions ==
Food and Drug Administration 2021: Lacrima factory obtained an A+ rating.

Golden Martenitsa 2023: Lacrima won the annual "Golden Martenitsa 2023" award.

INTER EXPO CENTER 2014: Lacrima received the Golden Medal at the INTER EXPO CENTER.

INTER EXPO CENTER 2023: Lacrima was awarded the Golden Medal at the INTER EXPO CENTER.

"Awards & Recognitions". Lacrima Dairy.

== Factory certifications ==
Lacrima Dairy has obtained several certifications.

ISO 9001:2015: Quality management systems certification.

ISO 22000:2018: Food safety management systems certification.

HACCP: Hazard Analysis and Critical Control Points certification.

IFS Food: International Featured Standards certification for food safety and quality.

FDA: Food and Drug Administration certification for compliance with U.S. food safety standards.
