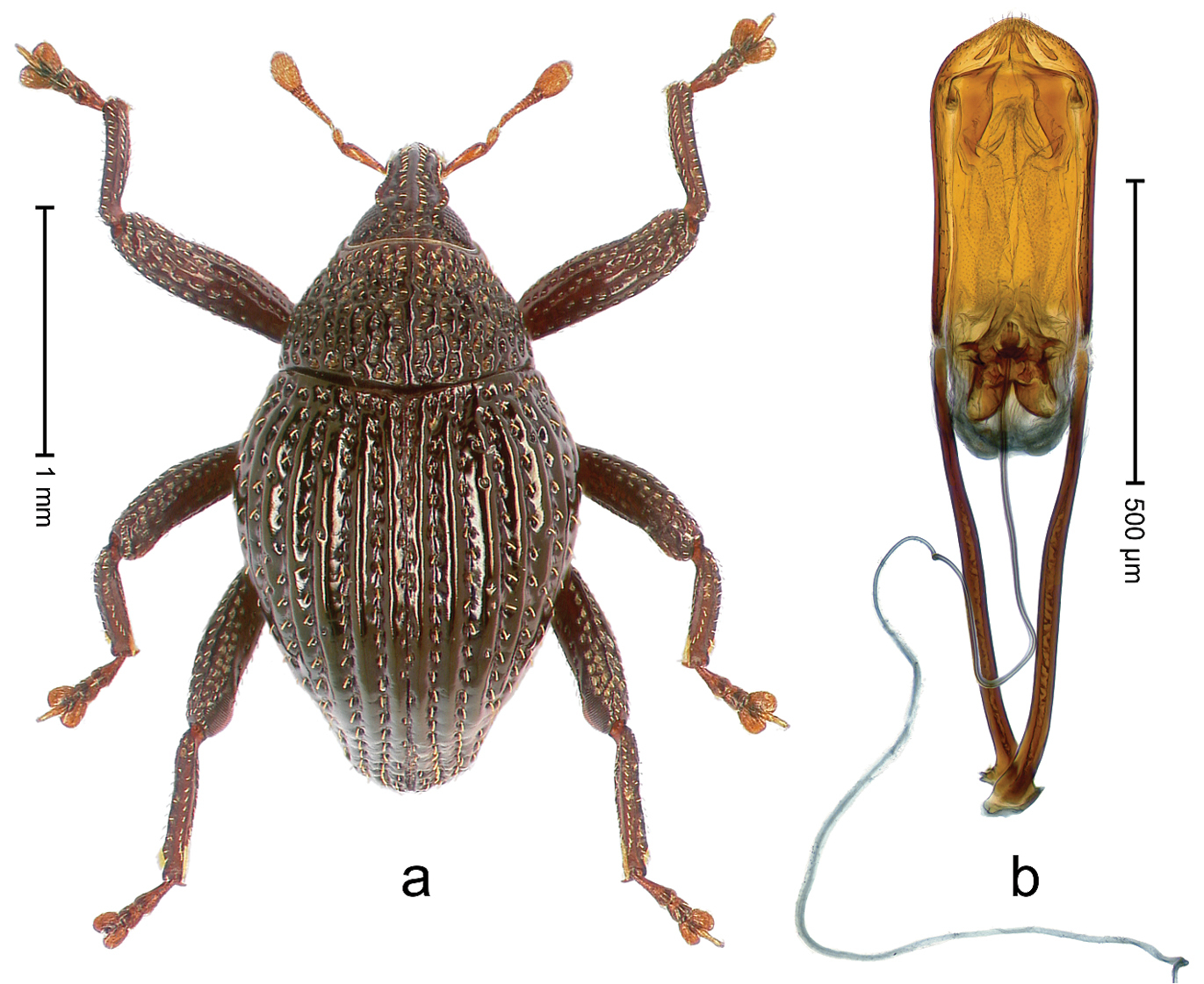

Scientific classification
- Kingdom: Animalia
- Phylum: Arthropoda
- Class: Insecta
- Order: Coleoptera
- Suborder: Polyphaga
- Infraorder: Cucujiformia
- Family: Curculionidae
- Genus: Trigonopterus
- Species: T. empat

Binomial name
- Trigonopterus empat Riedel, 2014

= Trigonopterus empat =

Species of beetle

Trigonopterus empat is a species of flightless weevil in the genus Trigonopterus from Indonesia.

== Etymology ==
The specific name is derived from the Indonesian word for "four".

== Description ==
Individuals measure 2.18–2.24 mm in length. Body is slightly oval in shape. General coloration is dark rust-colored to black, with rust-colored tarsi and antennae and bronze tinted elytra.

== Range ==
The species is found around elevations of 1,320–1,685 metres (4,331–5,528 ft) in Ruteng on the island of Flores, part of the Indonesian province of East Nusa Tenggara.

== Phylogeny ==
T. empat is part of the T. saltator species group.
