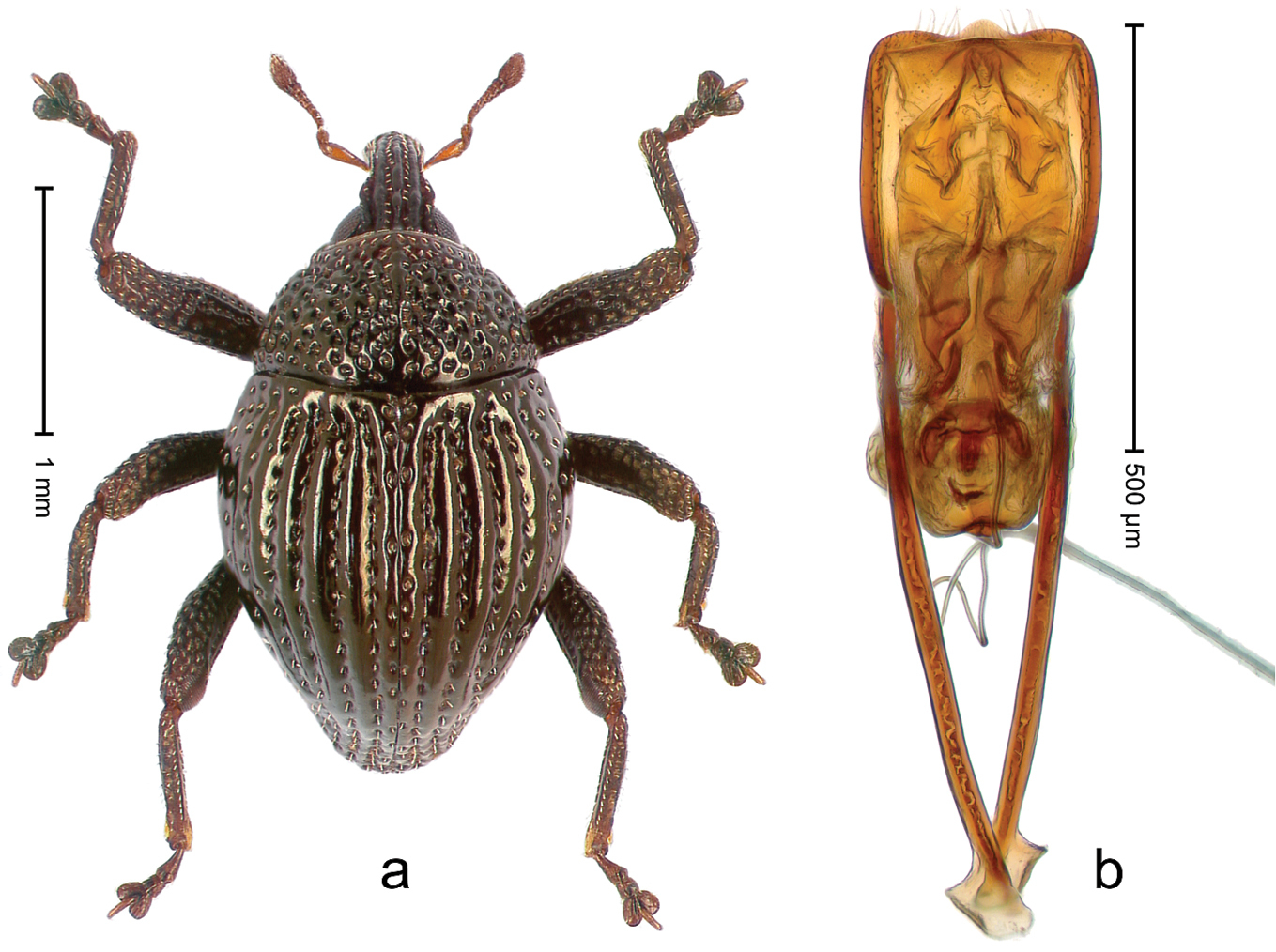

Scientific classification
- Kingdom: Animalia
- Phylum: Arthropoda
- Class: Insecta
- Order: Coleoptera
- Suborder: Polyphaga
- Infraorder: Cucujiformia
- Family: Curculionidae
- Genus: Trigonopterus
- Species: T. aeneomicans

Binomial name
- Trigonopterus aeneomicans Riedel, 2014

= Trigonopterus aeneomicans =

Species of beetle

Trigonopterus aeneomicans is a species of flightless weevil in the genus Trigonopterus from Indonesia. The species was described in 2014 and is named after the metallic sheen of its elytra. The beetle is 1.90–2.24 mm long. It has reddish-brown antennae and dark reddish-brown legs, while the rest of the body is black with a bronze sheen on the elytra. It is endemic to the Indonesian province of West Nusa Tenggara, where it is found on the islands of Sumbawa and Lombok at elevations of 830–1,350 m (2,720–4,430 ft).

== Taxonomy ==
Trigonopterus acuminatus was described by the entomologist Alexander Riedel in 2014 on the basis of an adult male specimen collected from Mount Rinjani on the island of Lombok in Indonesia. The specific spithet is derived from Latin aeneus, meaning "copper" or "bronze", and micans, meaning "shining", referring to the metallic sheen of the species elytra.

== Description ==
The beetle is 1.90–2.24 mm long. It has reddish-brown antennae and dark reddish-brown legs, while the rest of the body is black with a bronze sheen on the elytra. The body is somewhat oval, with a slight narrowing between the pronotum and elytra when viewed from above or from the side. The rostrum features a central ridge and two submedian ridges, with the grooves between them containing sparse rows of inward-pointing setae. The epistome has a faint, angled transverse ridge.

The pronotum is coarsely punctured, with a reticulate texture on the sides and longitudinal wrinkles near the middle. A median costa is present, along with sparse, semi-upright setae. The elytra have deeply impressed striae, each with a sparse row of slender, semi-upright scales. The flat areas between the grooves are raised and mostly smooth, with the sutural interval showing a few coarse punctures.

The femora have a simple, scalloped ridge on the underside. The hind femur has a stridulatory patch near the tip. The hind tibia ends in a uncus but lacks a premucro. The upper edge of the hind tibia is toothed in its basal third, and the middle tibia has a sharp tooth formed by an angled projection near the base. The fifth abdominal segment is coarsely punctured, with sparse, flat hairs and a faint central ridge.

The penis has nearly parallel sides and contains a pair of sclerites. Its tip is sparsely hairy and has a central, triangular extension. The transfer apparatus is symmetrical and thick, flagelliform, and twice as long as the penis. The apodemes are 2.4 times the length of the penis. The ductus ejaculatorius lacks a bulb but forms a distinct loop at the base and enters the transfer apparatus from the tip.

The bronze sheen may vary in intensity, and the sutural interval can be either ferruginous or black. In females, the rostrum is mostly smooth and punctured in the apical half, with a simple epistome. The coarse punctures on the elytra's sutural interval are either confined to the base or extend past the middle.

== Distribution ==
Trigonopterus acuminatus is endemic to the Indonesian province of West Nusa Tenggara, where it is found on the islands of Sumbawa and Lombok. On Lombok, it is known from near Santong, Sembalun, Senaru, Tetebatu, while on Sumbawa, it is known from near Batu Dulang and Tepal. It has been recorded from elevations of 830–1,350 m (2,720–4,430 ft).
