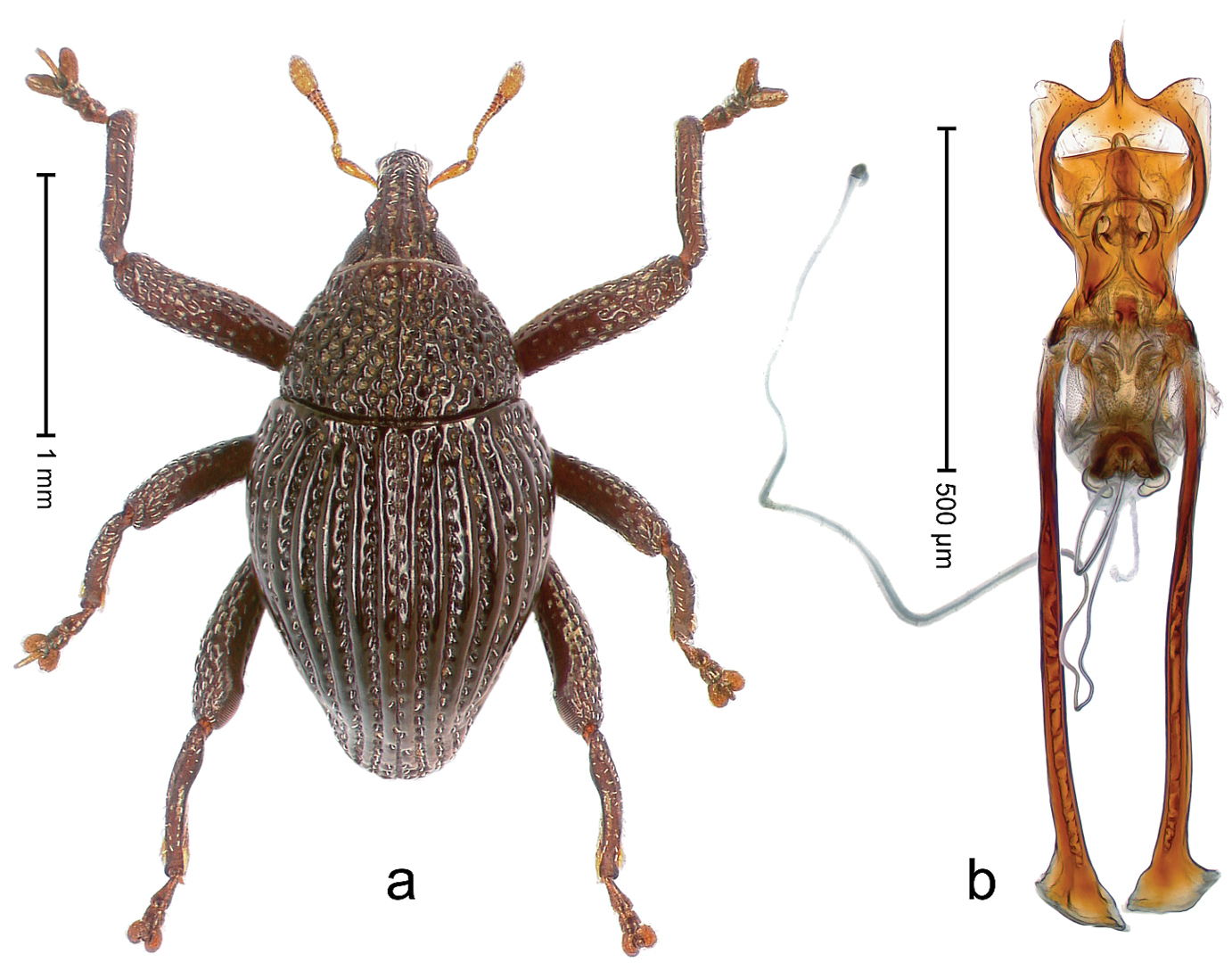

Scientific classification
- Kingdom: Animalia
- Phylum: Arthropoda
- Class: Insecta
- Order: Coleoptera
- Suborder: Polyphaga
- Infraorder: Cucujiformia
- Family: Curculionidae
- Genus: Trigonopterus
- Species: T. fissitarsis

Binomial name
- Trigonopterus fissitarsis Riedel, 2014

= Trigonopterus fissitarsis =

Species of beetle

Trigonopterus fissitarsis is a species of flightless weevil in the genus Trigonopterus from Indonesia.

== Etymology ==
The specific name is derived from the Latin word fissus, meaning "cleft", and the Greek word tarsos, plural of "ankle".

== Description ==
Individuals measure 2.04–2.14 mm in length. The body is slightly oval in shape. General coloration black, with rust-colored antennae and dark rust-colored legs.

== Range ==
The species is found around elevations of 1,215 metres (3,986 ft) near Lake Ranamese on the island of Flores, part of the Indonesian province of East Nusa Tenggara.

== Phylogeny ==
T. fissitarsis is part of the T. saltator species group.
