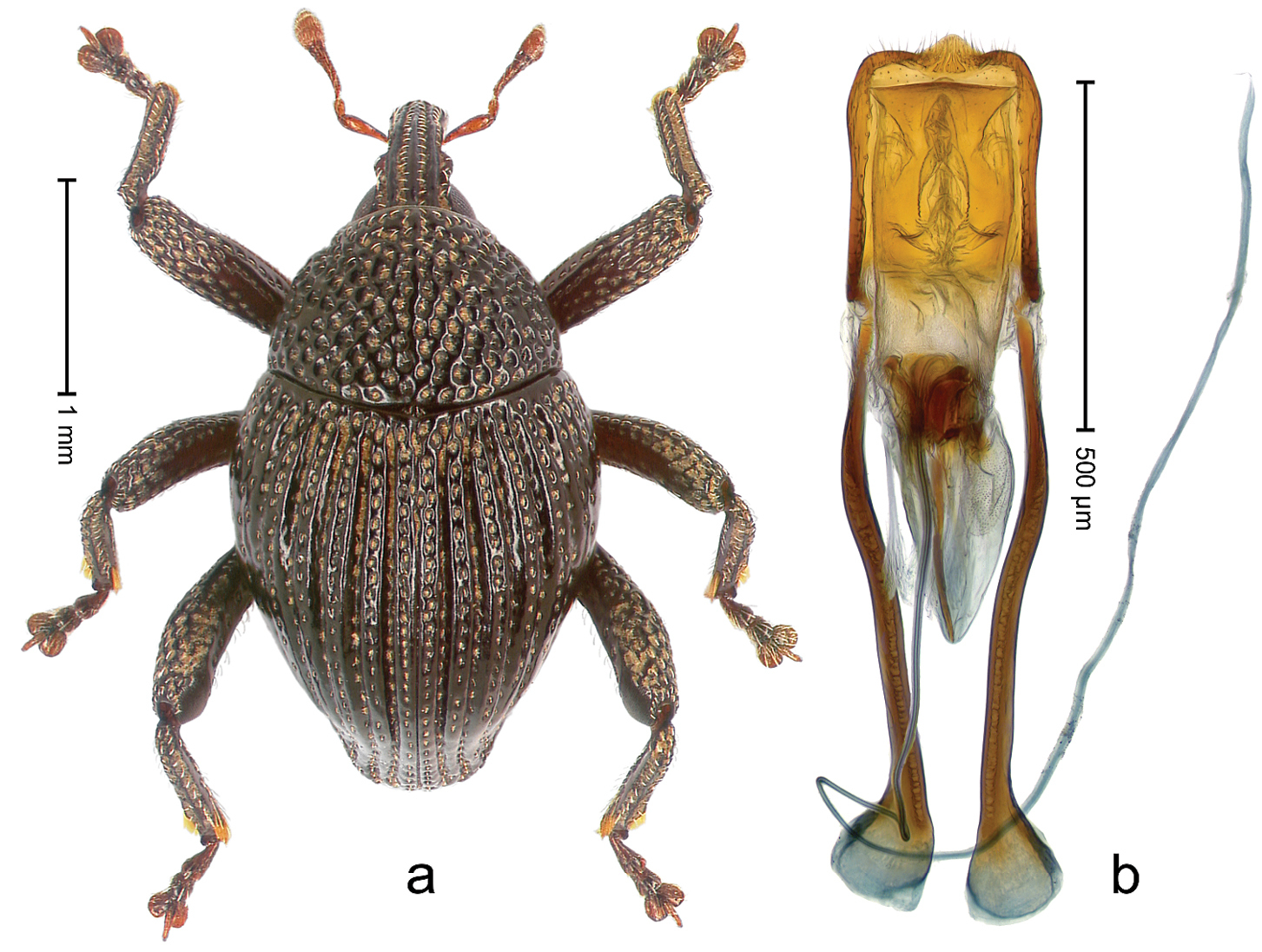

Scientific classification
- Kingdom: Animalia
- Phylum: Arthropoda
- Class: Insecta
- Order: Coleoptera
- Suborder: Polyphaga
- Infraorder: Cucujiformia
- Family: Curculionidae
- Genus: Trigonopterus
- Species: T. batukarensis

Binomial name
- Trigonopterus batukarensis Riedel, 2014

= Trigonopterus batukarensis =

Species of beetle

Trigonopterus batukarensis is a species of flightless weevil in the genus Trigonopterus from Indonesia. The species was described in 2014. The beetle is 2.48–2.78 mm long. It is mostly black, except for the ferruginous antennae and legs. Endemic to Bali, where it is known only from Mount Batukaru at elevations of 835–1,310 m (2,740–4,300 ft).

== Taxonomy ==
Trigonopterus batukarensis was described by the entomologist Alexander Riedel in 2014 on the basis of an adult male specimen collected from Mount Batukaru on the island of Bali in Indonesia. The species is named its type locality.

== Description ==
The beetle is 2.48–2.78 mm long. The antennae and legs are ferruginous, while the rest of the body is black. The body is subovate in shape, showing a slight constriction between the pronotum and elytra when viewed dorsally, and is convex in profile. The rostrum features a central ridge flanked by two submedian ridges, with the intervening furrows each containing a sparse row of inward-facing scales. The epistome bears a transverse ridge.

The pronotum is coarsely punctate and reticulate, with a faint median ridge and sparse, recumbent scales. The elytra have deeply incised striae dorsally and are marked laterally by rows of coarse punctures. The intervals are prominently costate, flattened on the dorsal side, and contain rows of punctures, each with a small recumbent scale. The sutural interval is barely widened at the base, and the elytral apex is subtruncate. Each femur has a simple anteroventral ridge, and the metafemur bears a stridulatory patch near the tip. Abdominal ventrite 5 is coarsely punctate and sparsely covered with suberect scales.

The penis has nearly parallel sides, with the apex featuring a median angular extension. The transfer apparatus includes a thin median rod that is 1.4 times the length of the penis body and projects basally. The apodemes are 2.6 times the length of the body, and the ductus ejaculatorius lacks a bulbus.

Elytral coloration varies from dark ferruginous to black. In females, the rostrum is slender in the apical half, nearly hairless on the dorsal side, and features submedian rows of punctures along with lateral punctate-rugose texture. The epistome is simple.

== Distribution ==
Trigonopterus batukarensis is endemic to the Indonesian island of Bali, where it is known only from Mount Batukaru. It has been recorded from elevations of 835–1,310 m (2,740–4,300 ft).
