= Transversal plane =

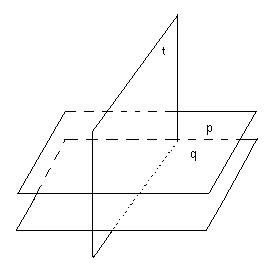
Plane "t" is a transversal plane because it intersects parallel planes "p" and "q".

In geometry, a transversal plane is a plane that intersects (not contains) two or more lines or planes. A transversal plane may also form dihedral angles.

== Theorems ==
Transversal plane theorem for lines: Lines that intersect a transversal plane are parallel if and only if their alternate interior angles formed by the points of intersection are congruent.

Transversal plane theorem for planes: Planes intersected by a transversal plane are parallel if and only if their alternate interior dihedral angles are congruent.

Transversal line containment theorem: If a transversal line is contained in any plane other than the plane containing all the lines, then the plane is a transversal plane.
