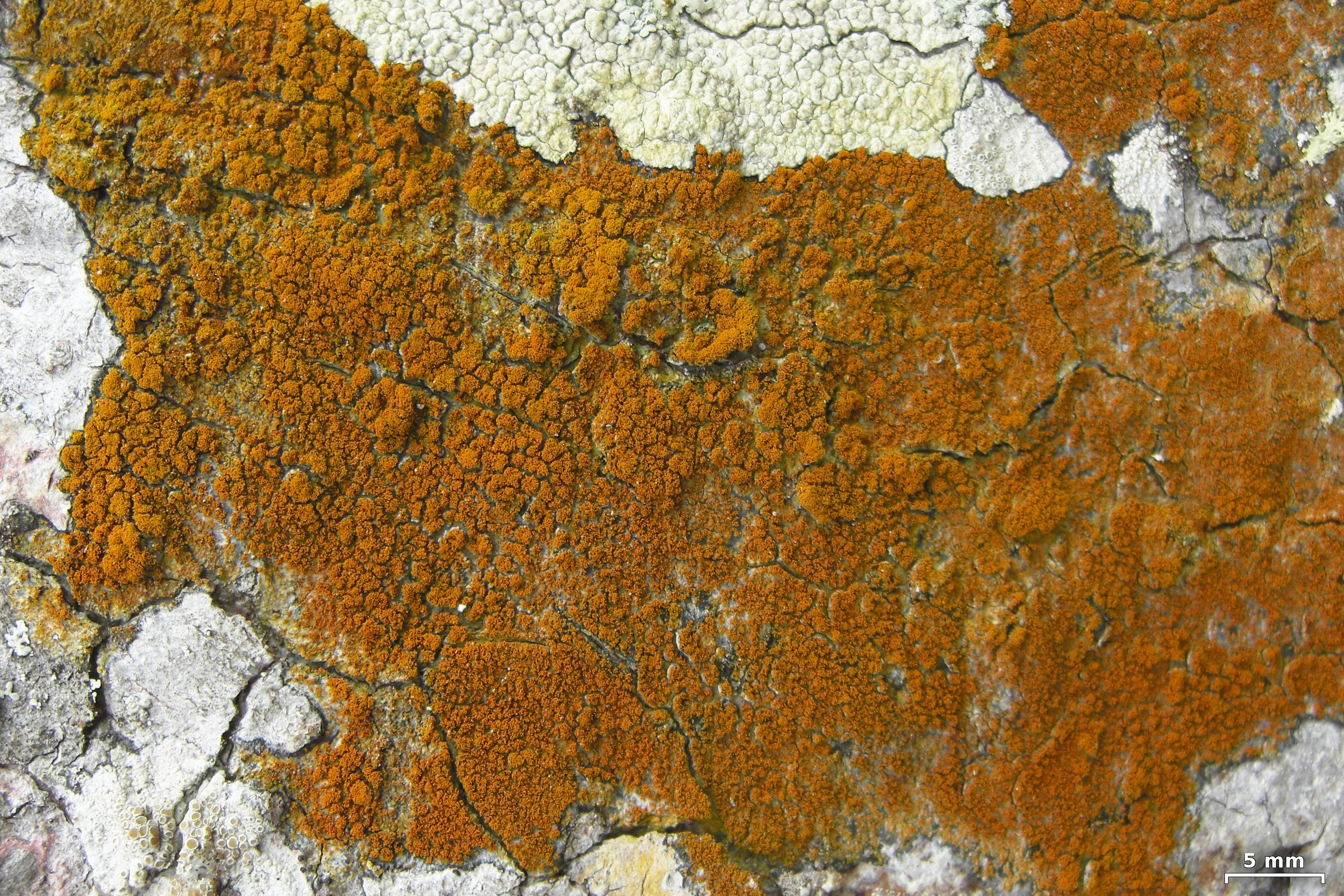
- Lacrima epiphora

Scientific classification
- Domain: Eukaryota
- Kingdom: Fungi
- Division: Ascomycota
- Class: Lecanoromycetes
- Order: Teloschistales
- Family: Teloschistaceae
- Genus: Lacrima; Bungartz, Arup & Søchting (2020)

Type species
- Lacrima epiphora (Taylor) Bungartz, Søchting & Arup (2020)

Species
- L. aphanotripta L. epiphora L. galapagoensis L. sonorae

= Lacrima (fungus) =

Genus of lichen-forming fungi

Lacrima is a genus of lichen-forming fungi in the family Teloschistaceae. It has four saxicolous (rock-dwelling), crustose species.

== Taxonomy ==
The genus was circumscribed by lichenologists Frank Bungartz, Ulf Arup, and Ulrik Søchting in 2020. They introduced this genus to accommodate a new species and three new combinations based on morphological, anatomical, chemical, and molecular data. They assigned Lacrima epiphora as the type species. This species was originally described by Thomas Taylor in 1847 with the binomial Lecanora epiphora. The genus name, Lacrima, is inspired by the unique tear-shaped isidia found in certain species. These cylindrical structures are slightly tapered at their base.

== Description ==
The thallus of Lacrima is saxicolous (growing on rocks) and crustose in nature, manifesting in growth patterns ranging from rimose to areolate. In some cases, the thallus may be underdeveloped or may have isidia, structures which in certain species of this genus have a distinct 'tear'-shaped appearance. The apothecia can be categorised as lecanorine to zeorine, with the asci being clavate and resembling the Teloschistes-type, typically bearing eight spores. The ascospores of this genus are polaribilocular, characterised by a wide septum.

Species of Lacrima contain chlorinated anthraquinones. Fragilin is the primary chemical found especially in the apothecia and, in some species, within the thallus as well.

== Distribution ==
At the time of its original publication, species of Lacrima have been discovered in the Neotropics, encompassing regions of Central America and the Galápagos Islands. Additionally, its presence has been recorded in North America, specifically within the Sonoran Desert Region.

== Species ==
- Lacrima aphanotripta (Nyl.) Bungartz, Søchting & Arup (2020) – Mexico through Central America (Caribbean) into South America (Brazil, Galápagos)
- Lacrima epiphora (Taylor) Bungartz, Søchting & Arup (2020) – neotropical regions of North, Central and South America
- Lacrima galapagoensis Bungartz & Søchting (2020) – Galápagos
- Lacrima sonorae (Wetmore) Søchting, Arup & Bungartz (2020) – North America
