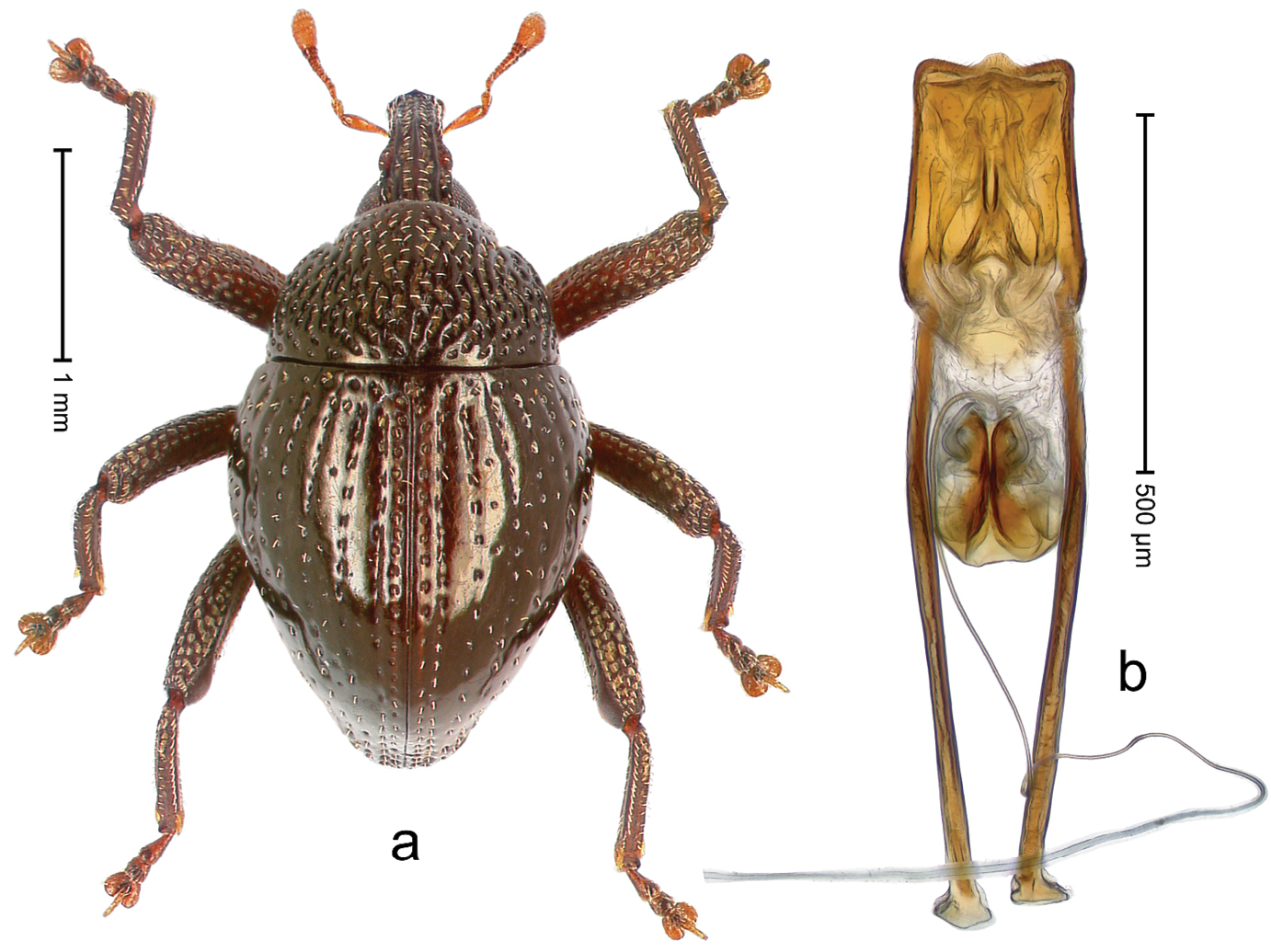

Scientific classification
- Kingdom: Animalia
- Phylum: Arthropoda
- Class: Insecta
- Order: Coleoptera
- Suborder: Polyphaga
- Infraorder: Cucujiformia
- Family: Curculionidae
- Genus: Trigonopterus
- Species: T. disruptus

Binomial name
- Trigonopterus disruptus Riedel, 2014

= Trigonopterus disruptus =

Species of beetle

Trigonopterus disruptus is a species of flightless weevil in the genus Trigonopterus from Indonesia.

== Etymology ==
The specific name is derived from the Latin word disruptus, meaning "broken apart". It refers to the species' scattered distribution.

== Description ==
Individuals measure 2.40–2.95 mm in length. The body is slightly oval in shape. General coloration is black, except for the antennae, which are a light rust-color, and the legs, which are a dark rust-color.

== Range ==
The species is found around elevations of 625–1,450 metres (2,051–4,757 ft) at Mt. Pengasingan, Sajang, Santong, Sembalun, Senaru, Sesaot, and Tetebatu on the island of Lombok in the Indonesian province of West Nusa Tenggara.

== Phylogeny ==
T. disruptus is part of the T. saltator species group.
