= Orbicularis oculi muscle =

Facial muscle that closes the eyelids

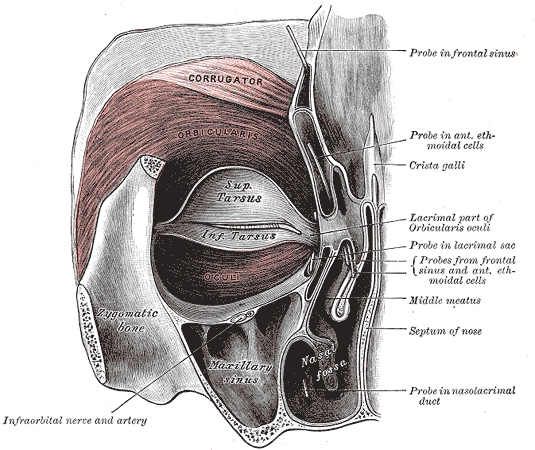

Details
- Origin: Frontal bone; medial palpebral ligament; lacrimal bone
- Insertion: Lateral palpebral raphe
- Artery: Ophthalmic, zygomatico-orbital, angular
- Nerve: Temporal (orbital, palpebral) and zygomatic (lacrimal) branches of facial nerve
- Actions: Closes eyelids
- Antagonist: Levator palpebrae superioris

Identifiers
- Latin: musculus orbicularis oculi also musculus orbicularis palpebrarum
- TA98: A04.1.03.013
- TA2: 2066
- FMA: 46779

The orbicularis oculi is a sphincter-like muscle in the face that closes the eyelids. It arises from the nasal part of the frontal bone, from the frontal process of the maxilla in front of the lacrimal groove, and from the anterior surface and borders of a short fibrous band, the medial palpebral ligament.

From this origin, the fibers are directed laterally, forming a broad and thin layer, which occupies the eyelids or palpebræ, surrounds the circumference of the orbit, and spreads over the temple, and downward on the cheek.

== Structure ==
There are at least 3 clearly defined sections of the orbicularis muscle. However, it is not clear whether the lacrimal section is a separate section, or whether it is just an extension of the preseptal and pretarsal sections.

=== Orbital orbicularis ===
The orbital portion is thicker and of a reddish color; its fibers form a complete ellipse without interruption at the lateral palpebral commissure; the upper fibers of this portion blend with the frontalis and corrugator.

=== Palpebral orbicularis ===
The palpebral portion of the muscle is thin and pale; it arises from the bifurcation of the medial palpebral ligament, forms a series of concentric curves, and is inserted into the lateral palpebral raphe at the outer canthus (corner) of the eye. The palpebral portion contains the preseptal and pretarsal muscles. The pretarsal orbicularis is thought to be responsible for the spontaneous blink.

=== Lacrimal orbicularis ===
The lacrimal part is a small, thin muscle, about 6 mm in breadth and 12 mm in length, situated behind the medial palpebral ligament and lacrimal sac. It arises from the posterior crest and adjacent part of the orbital surface of the lacrimal bone, and passing behind the lacrimal sac, divides into two slips, upper and lower, which are inserted into the superior and inferior tarsi medial to the puncta lacrimalia; occasionally it is very indistinct. The lacrimal orbicularis facilitates the tear pump into the lacrimal sac.

== Function ==
The muscle acts to close the eye, and is the only muscle capable of doing so. Loss of function for any reason results in an inability to close the eye, necessitating eye drops at the minimum to surgical closure of the eye in extreme cases.

The palpebral portion acts involuntarily, closing the lids gently, as in sleep or in blinking; the orbital portion is subject to conscious control. When the entire muscle is brought into action, the skin of the forehead, temple, and cheek is drawn toward the medial angle of the orbit, and the eyelids are firmly closed, as in photophobia. The skin thus drawn upon is thrown into folds, especially radiating from the lateral angle of the eyelids; these folds become permanent in senescence, and form the so-called "crow's feet". The levator palpebrae superioris muscle is the direct antagonist of this muscle; it raises the upper eyelid and exposes the front of the bulb of the eye. In addition, the orbital and palpebral portions can work independent of each other, as in the furrowing of the brows by contraction of the orbital to reduce glare while keeping the eyes open by virtue of the relaxation of the palpebral.

Each time the eyelids are closed through the action of the orbicularis, the medial palpebral ligament is tightened, the wall of the lacrimal sac is thus drawn lateralward and forward, so that a vacuum is made in it and the tears are sucked along the lacrimal canals into it. The lacrimal part of the orbicularis oculi draws the eyelids and the ends of the lacrimal canals medialward and compresses them against the surface of the globe of the eye, thus placing them in the most favorable situation for receiving the tears; it also compresses the lacrimal sac. This part comprises two pieces: Horner's muscle and the muscle of Riolan, the latter helps hold the eyelids together to keep the lacrimal passage waterproof.

Associated pathology, such as a lesion of the facial nerve seen in Bell's palsy results in the inability to blink or close the ipsilateral eyelid. Subsequent lack of irrigation increases the risk of corneal inflammation and ulcers.

A number of auxiliary muscles assist in cooperating with the eyelid muscles. For example, the corrugator supercilii pulls the eyebrows to the bridge of the nose, making a roof over the middle of the forehead and forehead wrinkles, used mainly to protect the eyes from excess sunlight. The procerus (pyramidalis) muscles, in the bridge of the nose, arise from the lower nasal bone to the lower forehead, on each side of the midline. The procerus muscles pull the skin into horizontal wrinkles. The frontalis muscle, which runs from the upper forehead, halfway between the coronal suture (which traverses the top of the skull) and the top edge of the orbit, attaches to the eyebrow skin. Since it pulls the eyebrows upward, it is the antagonist of the orbicularis oculi. It is used in looking up, and increasing vision if there is insufficient light or when objects are far away.

== Clinical significance ==
It is involved in the corneal reflex, part of the assessment of the function of the facial nerve. This can be used to examine the facial nerve even in unconscious patients.
