= Fossa for lacrimal sac =

Anatomical detail of the facial skeleton

Fossa for lacrimal sac Lacrimal fossa for the Lacrimal sac
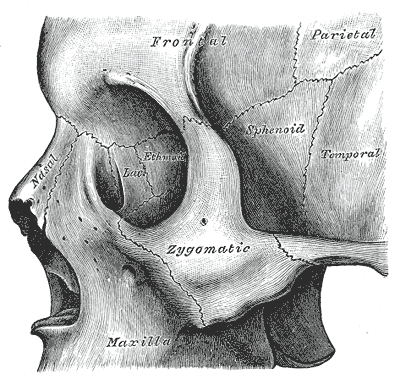
- Lacrimal bone, medial anterior orbital cavity. The location of the Lacrimal fossa for the Lacrimal sac

Details

Identifiers
- Latin: fossa sacci lacrimalis
- TA98: A02.1.00.082
- TA2: 486
- FMA: 54390

A smooth, more deeply concave depression on the lacrimal bone, which forms the medial wall of the orbital cavity, in which the lacrimal sac that drains into the nasolacrimal duct is located, is referred to as the lacrimal fossa (or fossa for the lacrimal sac).

== See also ==
- Fossa for lacrimal gland
