= Lacrimal tubercle =

Anatomical feature of the human head

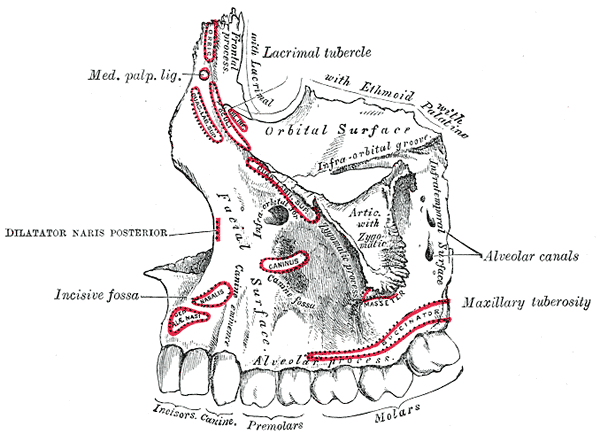
- Left maxilla. Outer surface. (Lacrimal tubercle labeled at center top.)

Details

Identifiers
- Latin: Tuberculum lacrimale

The lateral margin of the groove of the frontal process of the maxilla is named the anterior lacrimal crest, and is continuous below with the orbital margin; at its junction with the orbital surface is a small tubercle, the lacrimal tubercle, which serves as a guide to the position of the lacrimal sac.
