= Tarsus (eyelids) =

Connective tissue in the eyelid

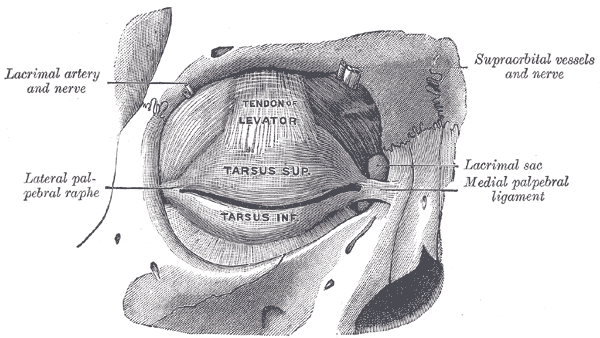
- The tarsi and their ligaments. Right eye; front view.

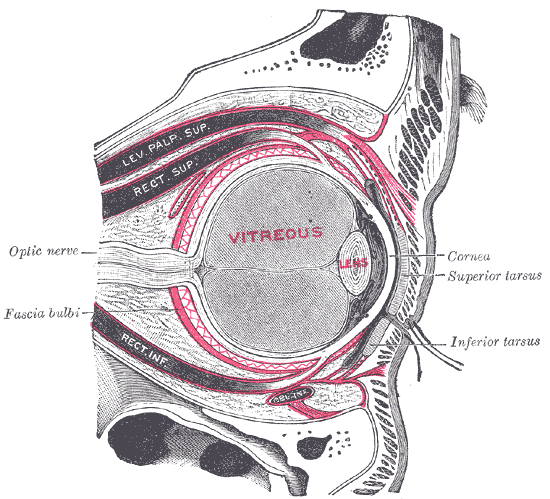
- The right eye in sagittal section, showing the fascia bulbi. (Tarsi labeled at right.)

Details

Identifiers
- Latin: tarsus superior, tarsus inferior
- TA98: A15.2.07.038; A15.2.07.039
- TA2: 6827, 6829
- FMA: 59086

The tarsi (sg.: tarsus) or tarsal plates are two comparatively thick, elongated plates of dense connective tissue, about 10 mm (0.39 in) in vertical dimension for the upper eyelid and 5 mm for the lower eyelid; one is found in each eyelid, and contributes to its form and support. They are located directly above the lid margins. The tarsus has a lower and upper part making up the palpebrae.

== Superior ==
The superior tarsus (tarsus superior; superior tarsal plate), the larger, is of a semilunar form, about 10 mm (0.4 in) in breadth at the center, and gradually narrowing toward its extremities. It is adjoined by the superior tarsal muscle.

To the anterior surface of this plate the aponeurosis of the levator palpebrae superioris is attached.

== Inferior ==
The inferior tarsus (tarsus inferior; inferior tarsal plate) is smaller, is thin, is elliptical in form, and has a vertical diameter of about 5 mm (0.2 in). The free or ciliary margins of these plates are thick and straight.

== Relations ==
The attached or orbital margins are connected to the circumference of the orbit by the orbital septum.

The lateral angles are attached to the zygomatic bone by the lateral palpebral raphe.

The medial angles of the two plates end at the lacrimal lake, and are attached to the frontal process of the maxilla by the medial palpebral ligament).

The sulcus subtarsalis is a groove in the inner surface of each eyelid.

Along the inner margin of the tarsus are modified sebaceous glands known as tarsal glands (or meibomian glands), aligned vertically within the tarsi: 30 to 40 glands in the upper lid, and 20 to 30 in the lower lid, which secrete a lipid-rich product which helps keep the lacrimal secretions or tears from evaporating too quickly, thus keeping the eye moist.

== Additional images ==
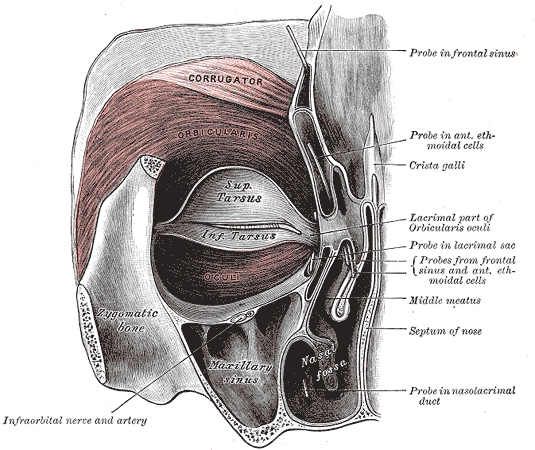
Left orbicularis oculi, seen from behind

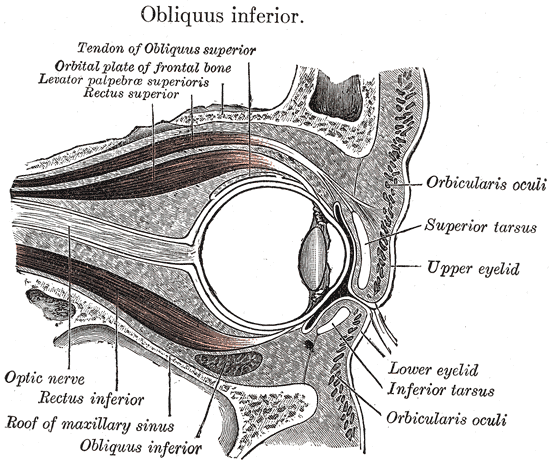
Sagittal section of right orbital cavity

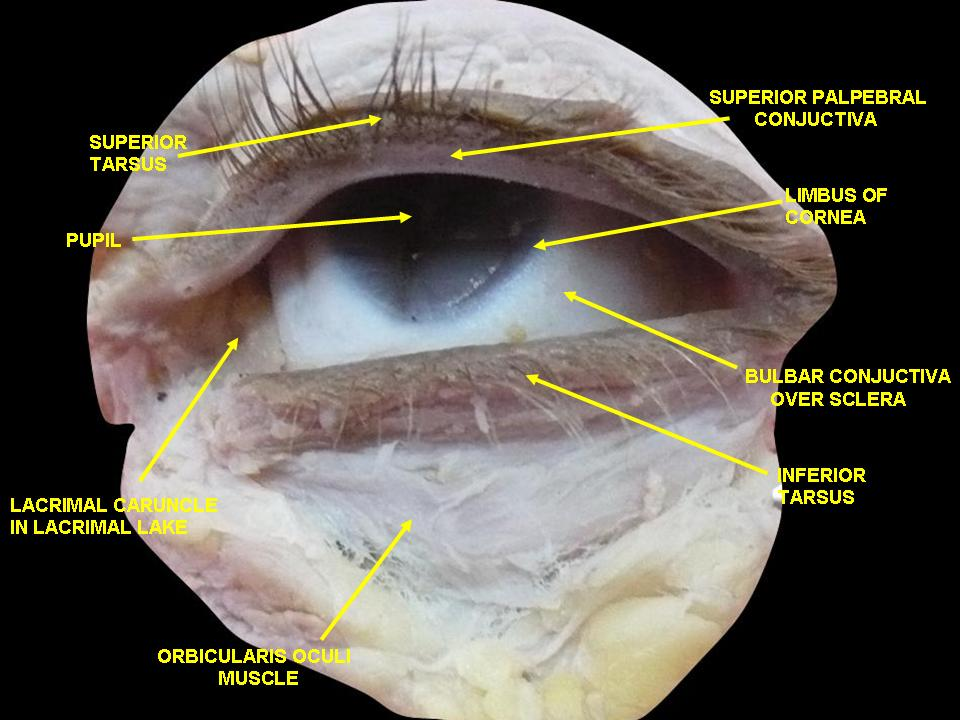
Extrinsic eye muscle. Nerves of orbita. Deep dissection.

== See also ==
- List of specialized glands within the human integumentary system
