= Lacrimal bone =

Smallest and most fragile bone of the human skull and face

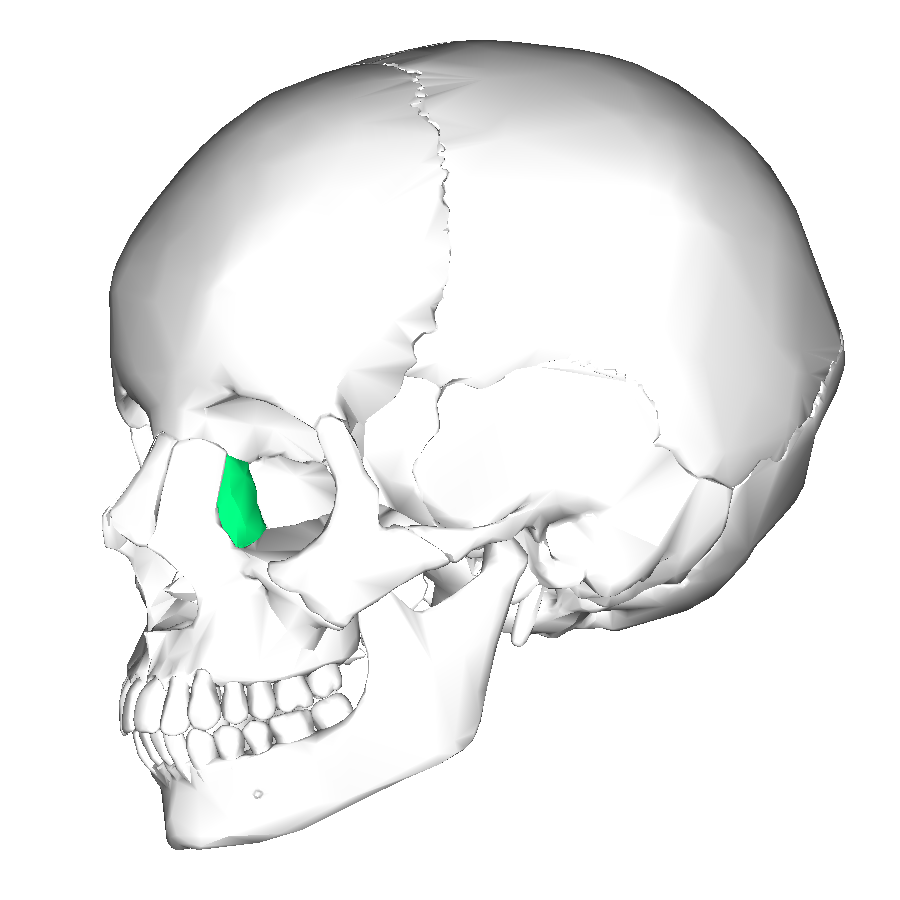
- Position of the lacrimal bone (shown in green)

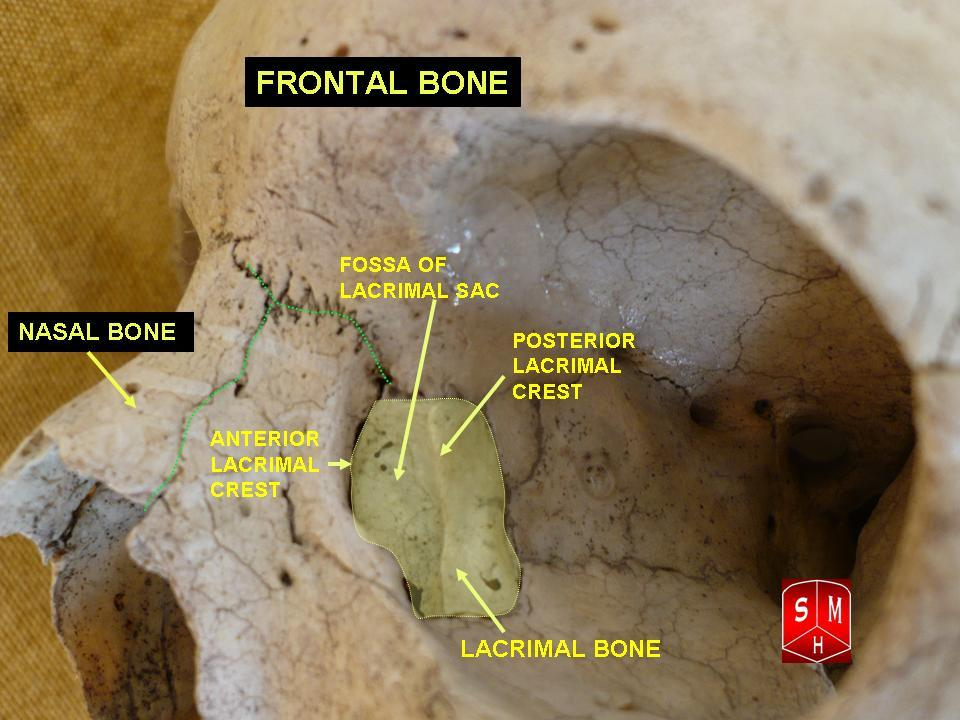
- Medial wall of the orbit. Lacrimal bone is in yellow.

Details

Identifiers
- Latin: os lacrimale
- TA98: A02.1.09.001
- TA2: 744
- FMA: 52741

The lacrimal bones are two small and fragile bones of the facial skeleton; in humans, they are roughly the size of the little fingernail and situated at the front part of the medial wall of the orbit. They each have two surfaces and four borders. Several bony landmarks of the lacrimal bones function in the process of lacrimation. Specifically, the lacrimal bones help form the nasolacrimal canal necessary for tear translocation. A depression on the anterior inferior portion of one bone, the lacrimal fossa, houses the membranous lacrimal sac. Tears, from the lacrimal glands, collect in this sac during excessive lacrimation. The fluid then flows through the nasolacrimal duct and into the nasopharynx. This drainage results in what is commonly referred to a runny nose during excessive crying or tear production. Injury or fracture of the lacrimal bone can result in posttraumatic obstruction of the lacrimal pathways.

== Structure ==
=== Lateral or orbital surface ===
The lateral or orbital surface is divided by a vertical ridge, the posterior lacrimal crest, into two parts.

In front of this crest is a longitudinal groove, the lacrimal sulcus (sulcus lacrimalis), the inner margin of which unites with the frontal process of the maxilla, and the lacrimal fossa is thus completed. The upper part of this fossa lodges the lacrimal sac, the lower part, the nasolacrimal duct.

The portion behind the crest is smooth, and forms part of the medial wall of the orbit.

The crest, with a part of the orbital surface immediately behind it, gives origin to the lacrimal part of the orbicularis oculi and ends below in a small, hook-like projection, the lacrimal hamulus, which articulates with the lacrimal tubercle of the maxilla, and completes the upper orifice of the nasolacrimal canal; the hamulus sometimes exists as a separate piece, and is then called the lesser lacrimal bone.

=== Medial or nasal surface ===
The medial or nasal surface presents a longitudinal furrow, corresponding to the crest on the lateral surface.

The area in front of this furrow forms part of the middle meatus of the nose. The area behind it articulates with the ethmoid, and completes some of the anterior ethmoidal cells.

=== Borders ===
Of the four borders:

- The anterior articulates with the frontal process of the maxilla;
- The posterior with the lamina papyracea of the ethmoid;
- The superior with the frontal bone.
- The inferior is divided by the lower edge of the posterior lacrimal crest into two parts:
  - The posterior part articulates with the orbital plate of the maxilla;
  - The anterior is prolonged downward as the descending process, which articulates with the lacrimal process of the inferior nasal concha, and assists in forming the canal for the nasolacrimal duct.

=== Development ===
The lacrimal is ossified from a single center, which appears about the twelfth week in the membrane covering the cartilaginous nasal capsule.

=== Articulations ===
The lacrimal articulates with four bones: two of the neurocranium, the frontal and ethmoid, and two of the viscerocranium, the maxilla and the inferior nasal concha.

== Other animals ==
Lacrimal bone in the reptile Lazarussuchus

In early lobe-finned fishes and ancestral tetrapods, the lacrimal bone is a relatively large and robust bone, running from the orbit to the nostrils. It forms part of the side of the face, between the nasal bones and the maxilla. In primitive forms, it is often accompanied by a much smaller septomaxilla bone, lying immediately behind the nasal opening, but this is lost in most modern species. The lacrimal bone is often smaller in living vertebrates, and is no longer always directly associated with the nasal opening, although it retains its connection with the orbit. The bone is entirely absent in living amphibians, as well as some reptilian species.

=== Dinosaurs ===
In dinosaurs, the lacrimal bone usually defines the anterior rim of the orbit (eye socket), and the posterior rim of the antorbital fenestra. In some theropods (e.g. Allosaurus, Ceratosaurus, Albertosaurus) the upper part of the lacrimal bone grew in such a manner as to form a horn on the top of the dinosaur's head, usually situated above, and anterior to the eye. In many dinosaurs, the lacrimal bone comes into contact with the nasal bone, the jugal bone, the prefrontal bone, and the maxillary and premaxillary bones. The boundaries where some of these bones meet with the others are called sutures. Rarely, the lacrimal bones fused with the nasal bones to form a pair of "nasolacrimal" crests, which are present in dinosaurs such as Dilophosaurus, Megapnosaurus and Sinosaurus.

== Additional images ==
Position of the lacrimal bones (shown in green). Animation.

Animation. Some bones are removed to show the position of the lacrimal bones (shown in green).

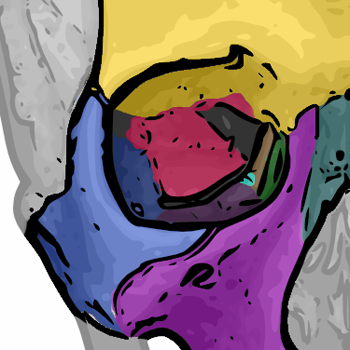
Orbital bones. Lacrimal bone shown in green.

A left lacrimal bone. Enlarged. Animation.

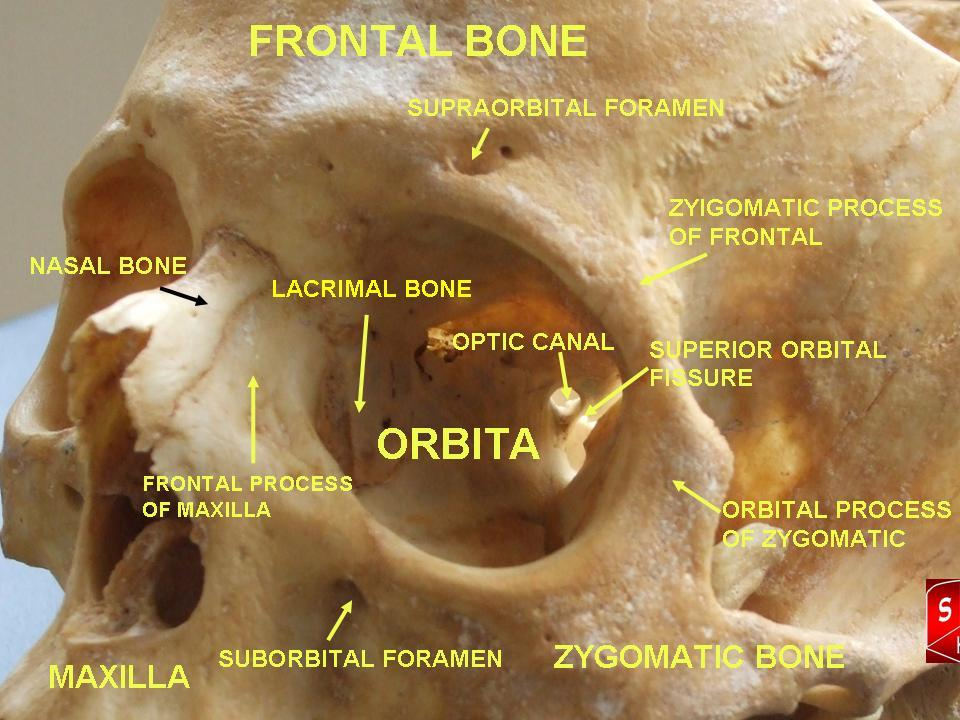
Lacrimal bone

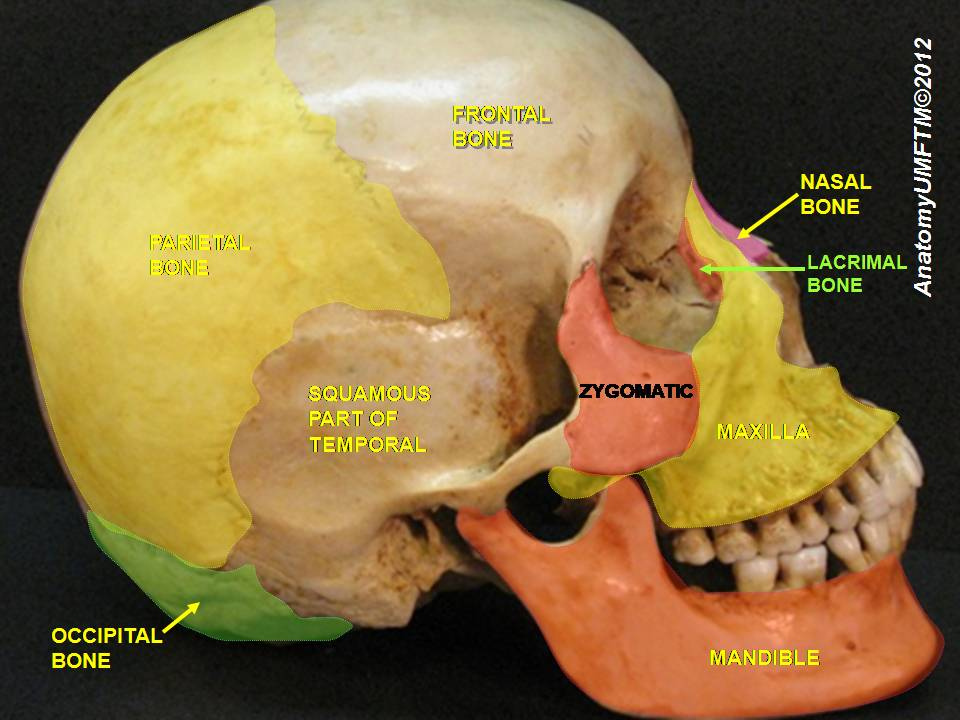
Lacrimal bone
