= Lacrimal groove =

Sulcus in the jaw that leads to the sinus opening

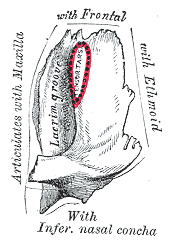
- Left lacrimal bone. Orbital surface. Enlarged. (Lacrimal groove visible at left.)

Details

Identifiers
- Latin: sulcus lacrimalis ossis lacrimalis
- TA98: A02.1.09.003
- TA2: 746
- FMA: 57613

On the nasal surface of the body of the maxilla, in front of the opening of the sinus is a deep groove, the lacrimal groove (or lacrimal sulcus), which is converted into the nasolacrimal canal, by the lacrimal bone and inferior nasal concha; this canal opens into the inferior meatus of the nose and transmits the nasolacrimal duct.

== Additional images ==
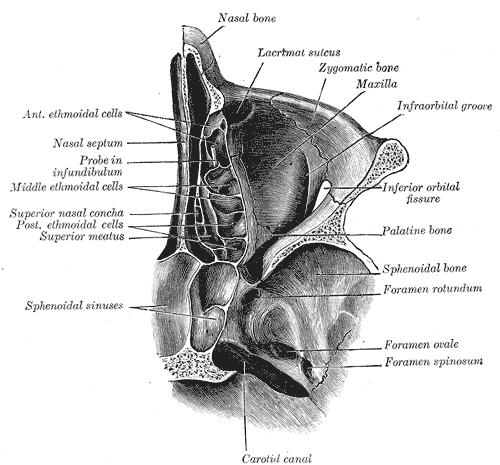
Horizontal section of nasal and orbital cavities.
