= Lacrimal sac =

Upper, dilated end of the nasolacrimal duct

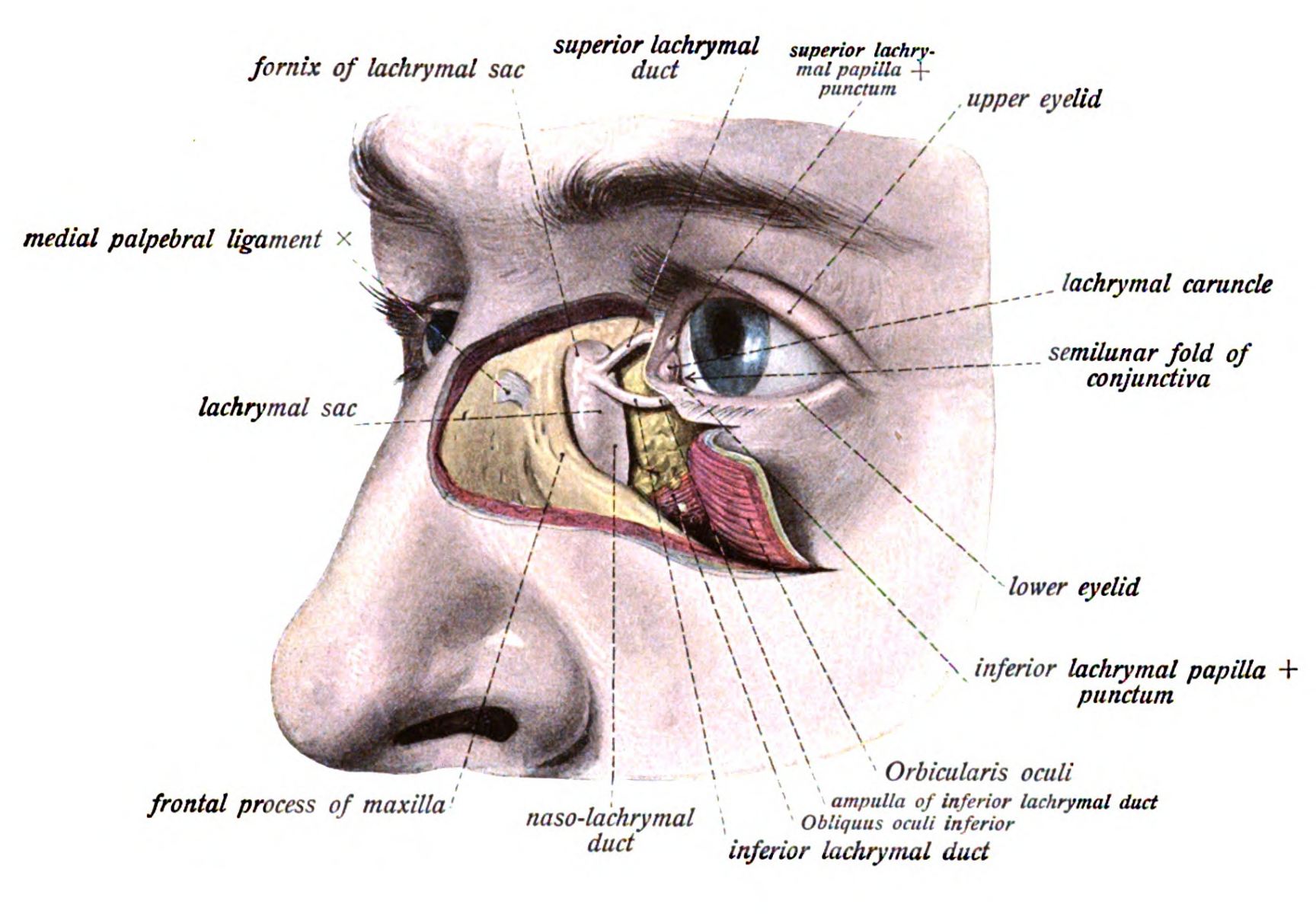
- The lacrimal apparatusis shown through dissection on the left side.

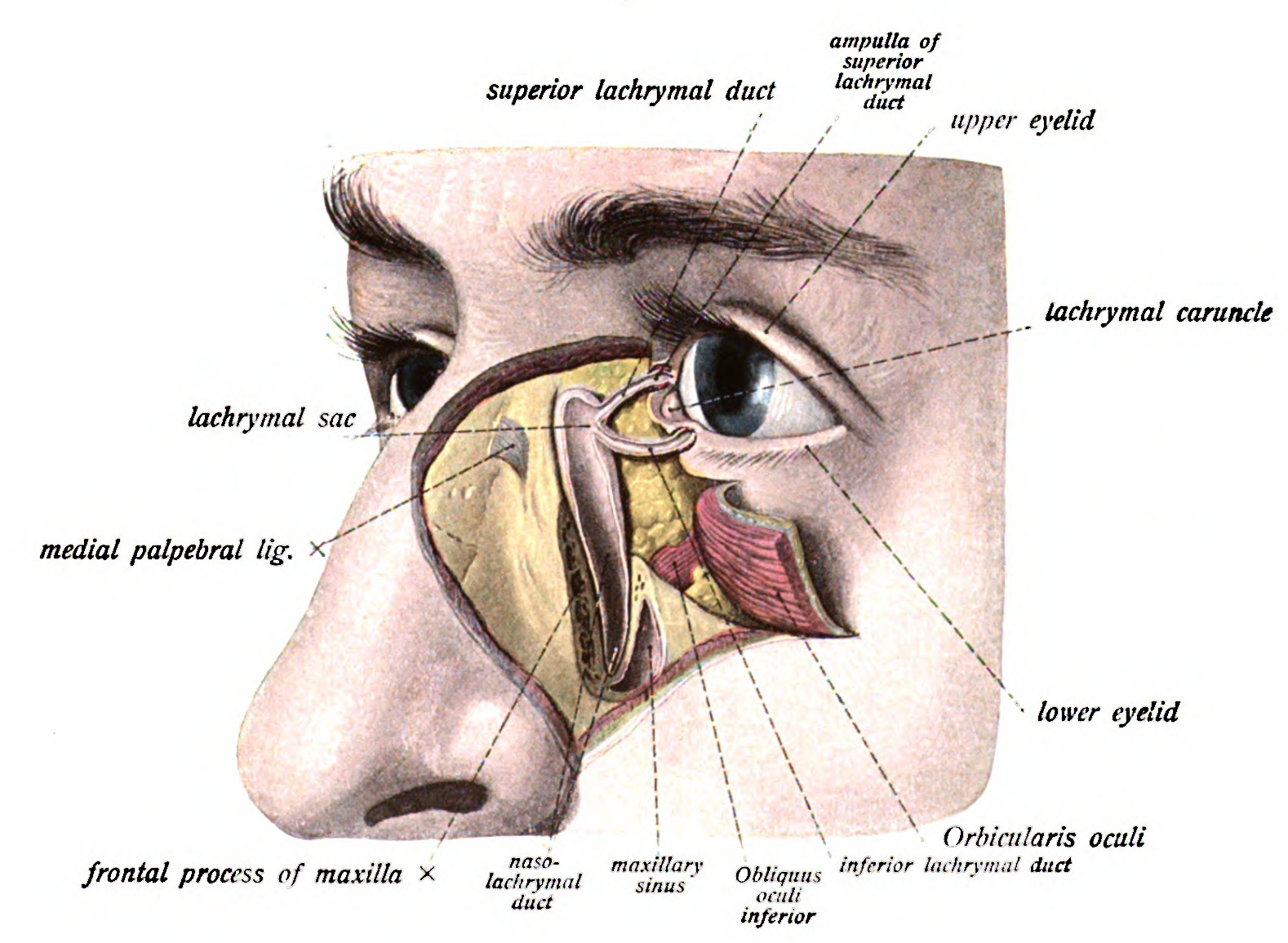
- The lacrimal sac has been opened showing internal organization as well as the naso-lacrymal duct.

Details
- Artery: Angular artery

Identifiers
- Latin: saccus lacrimalis
- TA98: A15.2.07.068
- TA2: 6857
- FMA: 20289

The lacrimal sac or lachrymal sac is the upper dilated end of the nasolacrimal duct, and is lodged in a deep groove formed by the lacrimal bone and frontal process of the maxilla. It connects the lacrimal canaliculi, which drain tears from the eye's surface, and the nasolacrimal duct, which conveys this fluid into the nasal cavity. Lacrimal sac occlusion leads to dacryocystitis.

== Structure ==
It is oval in form and measures from 12 to 15 mm. in length; its upper end is closed and rounded; its lower is continued into the nasolacrimal duct.

Its superficial surface is covered by a fibrous expansion derived from the medial palpebral ligament, and its deep surface is crossed by the lacrimal part of the orbicularis oculi, which is attached to the crest on the lacrimal bone.

=== Histology ===
Like the nasolacrimal duct, the sac is lined by stratified columnar epithelium with mucus-secreting goblet cells, with surrounding connective tissue. The lacrimal sac also drains the eye of debris and microbes.

== Function ==
It serves as a reservoir for overflow of tears, in which the lacrimal sac pumps inward and outward driven by the orbicularis muscle during blinking.

== Imaging ==
The lacrimal sac can be imaged by dacrocystography, in which radiocontrast is injected, followed by X-ray imaging.

== Additional images ==
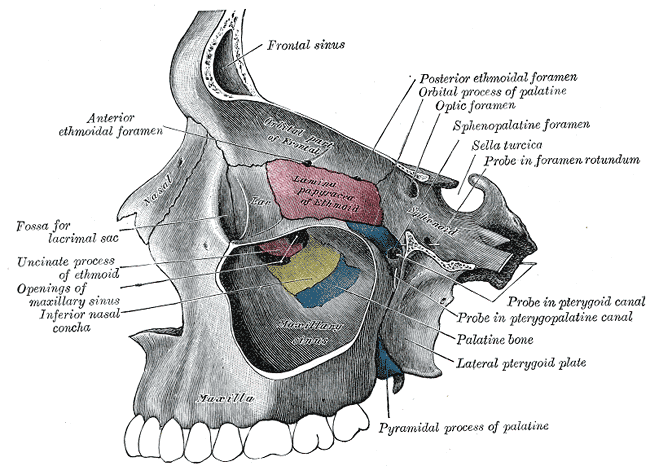
Medial wall of left orbit.

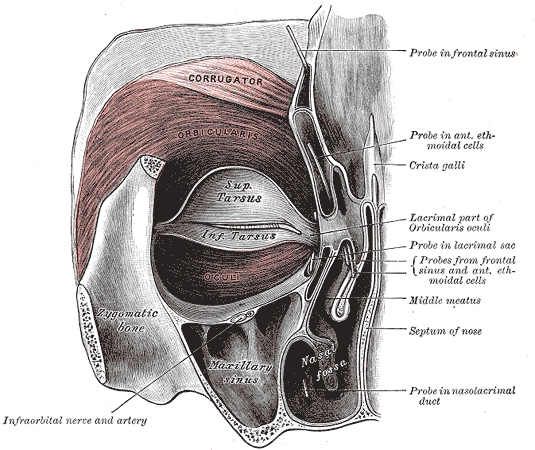
Left orbicularis oculi, seen from behind.

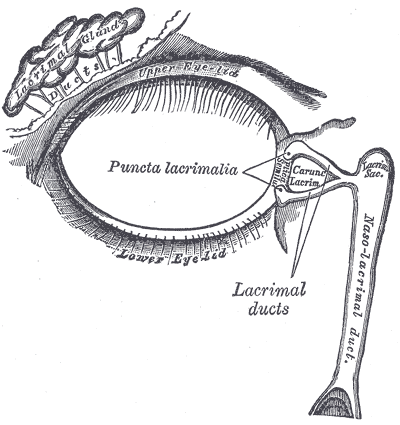
The lacrimal apparatus. Right side. (Lacrimal sac visible at upper right.)

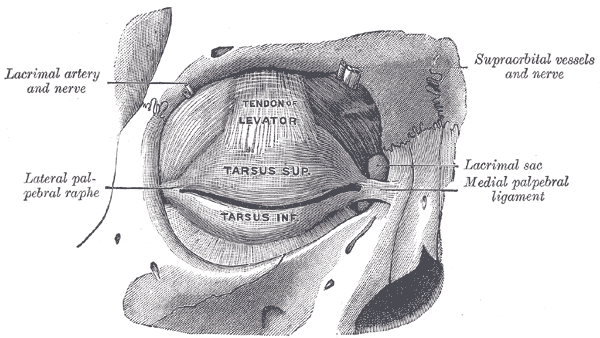
The tarsi and their ligaments. Right eye; front view. (Lacrimal sac visible at middle right.)

== See also ==
- Lacrimal apparatus
