= Nasolacrimal duct obstruction =

Blockage of the tear ducts

- Other names: Dacryocystitis
- Tear system consists of lacrimal gland (a), punctums (b,e), canalicules (c,f), lacrimal sac (d). Tear is then drained through nasolacrimal duct (g) into nasal cavity
- Specialty: Ophthalmology
- Differential diagnosis: Tears arising from lacrimal sac fistula.

Nasolacrimal duct obstruction is the obstruction of the nasolacrimal ducts (better known as the tear ducts) and may be either congenital or acquired. Obstruction of the nasolacrimal ducts leads to the excess overflow of tears called epiphora.

== Sign and symptoms ==
Excessive tearing is the most common complaint of patients with nasolacrimal duct obstruction, followed by acute or chronic infections. Pain at the side of the nose suggests dacryocystitis.

Nasolacrimal duct obstruction is more common with increasing age and more common in females than males.

== Cause ==
=== Involutional stenosis ===
Involutional stenosis is probably the most common cause of nasolacrimal duct obstruction in older people. It affects women twice as frequently as men. Although the inciting event in this process is unknown, clinicopathologic study suggests that compression of the lumen of the nasolacrimal duct is caused by inflammatory infiltrates and edema. This may be the result of an unidentified infection or possibly an autoimmune disease.

=== Dacryolith ===
Dacryoliths or cast formation, within the lacrimal sac can also produce obstruction of the nasolacrimal duct.

=== Sinus disease ===
Sinus disease often occurs in conjunction with, and in other instances may contribute to the development of nasolacrimal duct obstruction. Patients should be asked about previous sinus surgery, as the nasolacrimal duct is sometimes damaged when the maxillary sinus ostium is being enlarged anteriorly.

=== Trauma ===
Naso-orbital fractures may involve the nasolacrimal duct. Early treatment by fracture reduction with stenting of the entire lacrimal drainage system should be considered. However, such injuries are often not recognized or are initially neglected as more serious injuries are managed. In such cases, late treatment of persistent epiphora usually requires dacryocystorhinostomy.

=== Inflammatory disease ===
Granulomatous disease, including sarcoidosis, granulomatosis with polyangiitis, and midline granuloma, may also lead to nasolacrimal duct obstruction.

=== Lacrimal plugs ===
As with similar cases of canalicular obstruction, dislodged punctal and canalicular plugs can migrate to and occlude the nasolacrimal duct.

=== Neoplasm ===
Neoplasm should be considered in any patient presenting with nasolacrimal duct obstruction. In patients with atypical presentations, including younger age and male gender, further workup is appropriate. Bloody punctual discharge or lacrimal sac distension above the medial canthal tendon is also highly suggestive of neoplasm.

=== Congenital ===
Congenital nasolacrimal duct obstruction, or dacryostenosis, occurs when the lacrimal duct has failed to open at the time of birth, most often due to an imperforate membrane at the valve of Hasner. Around 6% of infants have congenital nasolacrimal duct obstruction, or dacryostenosis, usually experiencing a persistent watery eye even when not crying. If a secondary infection occurs (dacryocystitis), purulent (yellow / green) discharge may be present.

Most cases resolve spontaneously, with antibiotics reserved only if conjunctivitis occurs. Lacrimal sac massage has been proposed as helping to open the duct, though this is not always successful. The aim of massage is to generate enough hydrostatic pressure (downward, toward the nose) to "pop" open any obstruction. Additional massage may then be performed up toward the lacrimal punctum, in order to express any infectious material out of the nasolacrimal sac. When discharge or crusting is present, the lids should be gently cleaned using cooled pre-boiled water or saline.

Referral to an ophthalmologist is indicated if symptoms are still present at 12 months, or sooner if significant symptoms or recurrent infections occur. Nasolacrimal duct probing may be performed in the office setting (usually from 4 to 8 months of age) or under general anesthesia in an operating room for older patients. The success rate of probing is higher for younger children. A silastic tube or stent may be employed along with probing to maintain tear duct patency. A systematic review comparing immediate probing with deferred probing found that in children with unilateral nasolacrimal duct obstruction, immediate probing resulted in a higher success rate of treatment compared to deferred probing.

== Diagnosis ==
Evaluation is in the form of a dye disappearance test followed by irrigation test. By using this sequence (with modifications) as a guide, the physician can frequently streamline diagnostic testing.

=== Dye disappearance test ===
The dye disappearance test is useful for assessing the presence or absence of adequate lacrimal outflow, especially in unilateral cases. It is more heavily relied upon in children, in whom lacrimal irrigation is impossible without deep sedation. Using a drop of sterile 2% fluorescein solution or a moistened fluorescein strip, the examiner instills fluorescein into the conjunctival fornices of each eye and then observes the tear film, preferably with the cobalt blue filter of the slit lamp. Persistence of significant dye and, particularly asymmetric clearance of the dye from the tear meniscus over a 5-minute period indicate an obstruction. If the dye disappearance test result is normal, severe lacrimal drainage dysfunction is highly unlikely. The Jones tests are variations of the dye disappearance test.

=== Irrigation test ===
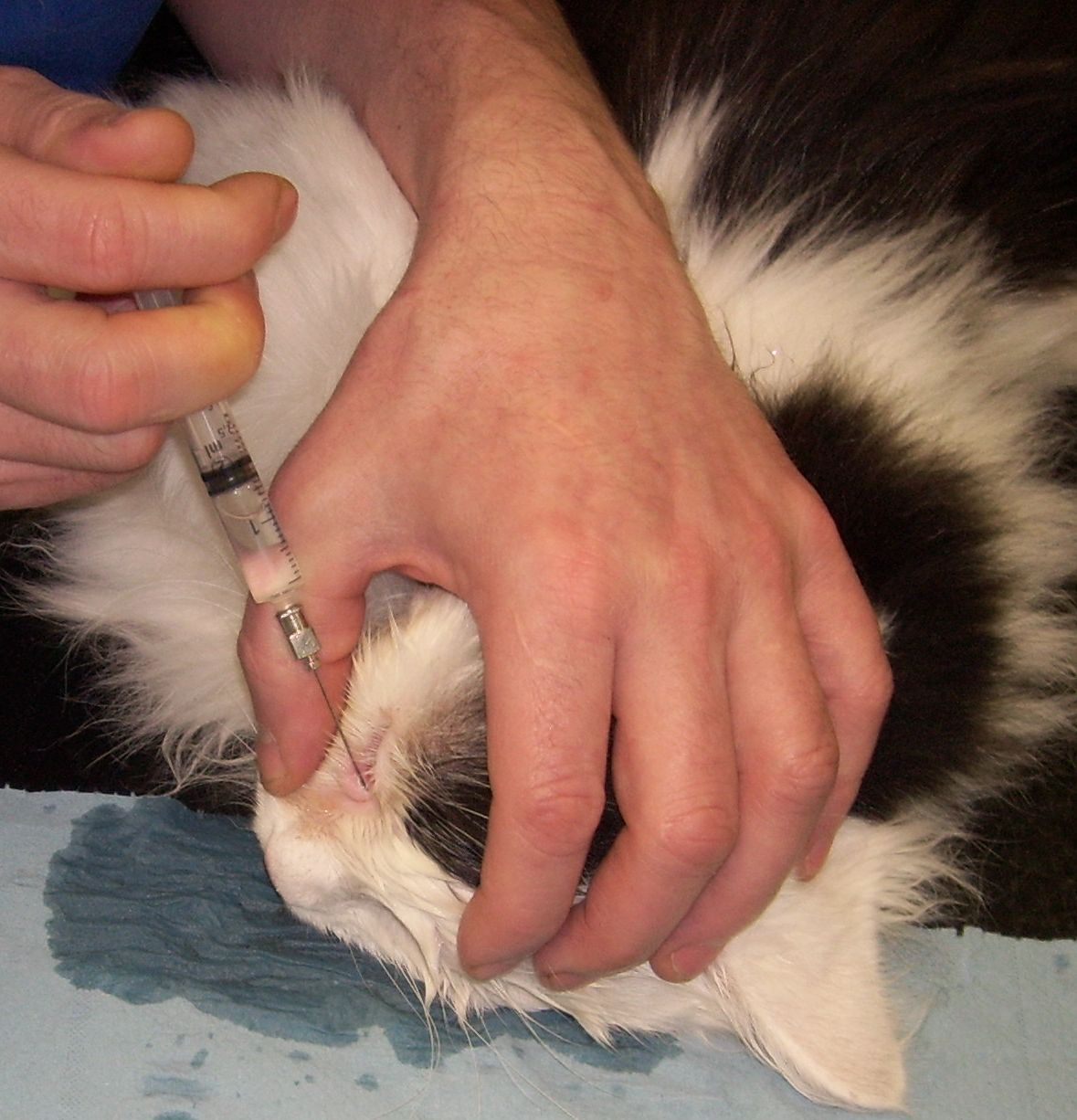
Flushing the nasolacrimal duct in a cat.

In irrigation test, a lacrimal irrigation cannula is passed into the punctum and advanced through the canaliculus to the lacrimal fossa. Clear water or saline is then irrigated through the cannula. If fluid passes into the nose without reflux out of the opposite canaliculus, the system is patent. If no fluid passes but it all comes back through either punctum, nasolacrimal duct obstruction is present.

== Management ==
=== Intubation and stenting ===
Some clinicians believe that partial stenosis of the nasolacrimal duct with symptomatic epiphora sometimes responds to surgical intubation of the entire lacrimal drainage system. This procedure should be performed only if the tubes can be passed easily. In complete nasolacrimal duct obstruction, intubation alone is not effective, and a dacryocystorhinostomy should be considered.

=== Dacryocystorhinostomy ===
A dacryocystorhinostomy is the treatment of choice for most patients with acquired nasolacrimal duct obstruction. Surgical indications include recurrent dacryocystitis, chronic mucoid reflux, painful distension of the lacrimal sac, and bothersome epiphora. For patients with dacryocystitis, active infection should be cleared, if possible, before a dacryocystorhinostomy is performed.

== See also ==
- Imperforate lacrimal punctum
- Lacrimal apparatus
- Nasolacrimal duct
