= Dacryoscintigraphy =

Nuclear imaging technique for the tear ducts and glands

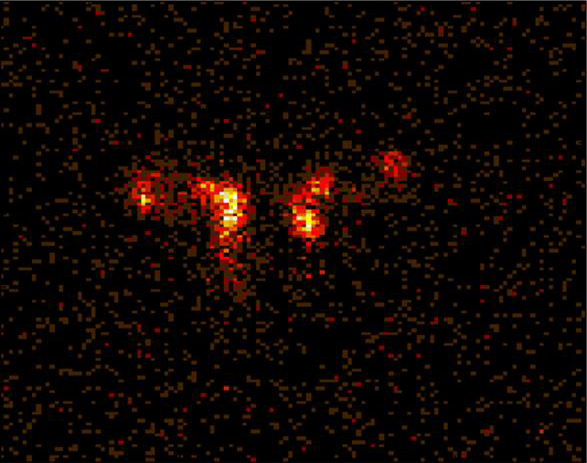
- Synonyms: microscintigraphy nuclear dacryocystogram nuclear lacrimal scan lacrimal scintillography
- ICD-10-PCS: C8191ZZ
- LOINC: 39670-5

Dacryoscintigraphy (DSG), also known as lacrimal scintigraphy, is a nuclear medicine technique for imaging the lacrimal apparatus. It is used to identify obstructions, for example in the lacrimal duct, nasal cavity or nasolacrimal duct.

== Procedure ==
The typical procedure involves use of Technetium-99m colloid, or in some cases pertechnetate. The colloid is prepared with an activity of approximately 20 megabecquerels in 1 millilitre (ml). Patients place their head in a support and chin rest and a single drop of 0.01 ml is delivered to each eye. Imaging with a gamma camera commences immediately, with a number of images acquired over 15 minutes.

== Clinical applications ==
Typical indications include epiphora and dacryocystitis.

DSG allows quantification of tear turnover and drainage. Various quantification models have been developed, which must account for the variable drainage of asymptomatic systems. Some drugs administered to the eye via eye drops, such as beta blockers for glaucoma, can be hazardous if quickly drained and absorbed through the nasolacrimal duct. DSG is considered the best method to quantitatively assess the proportion of the dose drained in this way. It can also be useful in assessing functional problems, where the lacrimal system appears unobstructed, and for post-operative progress.

Advantages of DSG over dacrocystography include better functional information and a lack of injection. DSG does not provide precise localisation and may not be useful in cases of complete obstruction.

== History ==
The technique was first introduced in 1972.
