= Dacryocystitis =

Infection of the lacrimal sac of the eye

- Other names: field = Ophthalmology
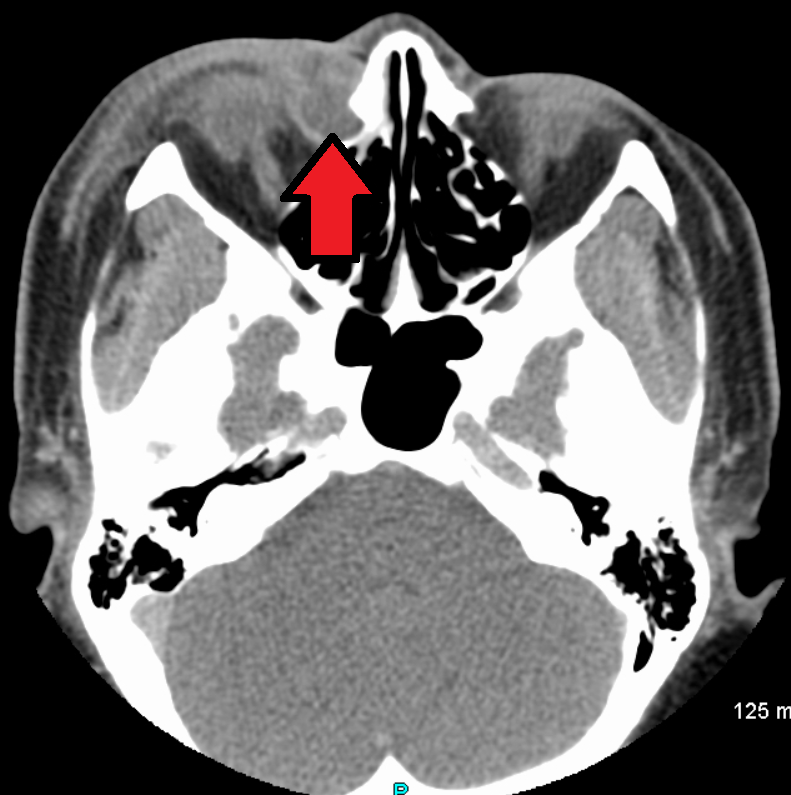
- A case of dacryocystitis as seen on CT scan
- Specialty: Ophthalmology

Dacryocystitis is an infection of the lacrimal sac, secondary to obstruction of the nasolacrimal duct at the junction of the lacrimal sac. The term derives from Greek dákryon 'tear' cysta 'sac' and -itis 'inflammation'. It causes pain, redness, and swelling over the inner aspect of the lower eyelid and epiphora. When nasolacrimal duct obstruction is secondary to a congenital barrier it is referred to as dacryocystocele. It is most commonly caused by Staphylococcus aureus and Streptococcus pneumoniae. The most common complication is corneal ulceration, frequently in association with S. pneumoniae. The mainstays of treatment are oral antibiotics, warm compresses, and relief of nasolacrimal duct obstruction by dacryocystorhinostomy.

== Signs and symptoms ==
- Pain, swelling, redness over the lacrimal sac at medial canthus
- Tearing, crusting, fever
- Digital pressure over the lacrimal sac may extrude pus through the punctum (also called roplas test positive)
- In chronic cases, tearing may be the only symptom

== Pathophysiology ==
A variety of causes may lead to dacryocystitis. Most notably, obstruction of the nasolacrimal duct leads to stasis of the nasolacrimal fluid, which predisposes to infection. Staphylococcus aureus is a common bacterial pathogen causing infectious dacryocystitis. Sometimes, especially in women, stones may develop in the lacrimal gland, causing recurrent bouts of dacryocystitis; this condition is called "acute dacryocystic retention syndrome." Also due to pneumococcus, infection due to surrounding structure such as paranasal sinuses.

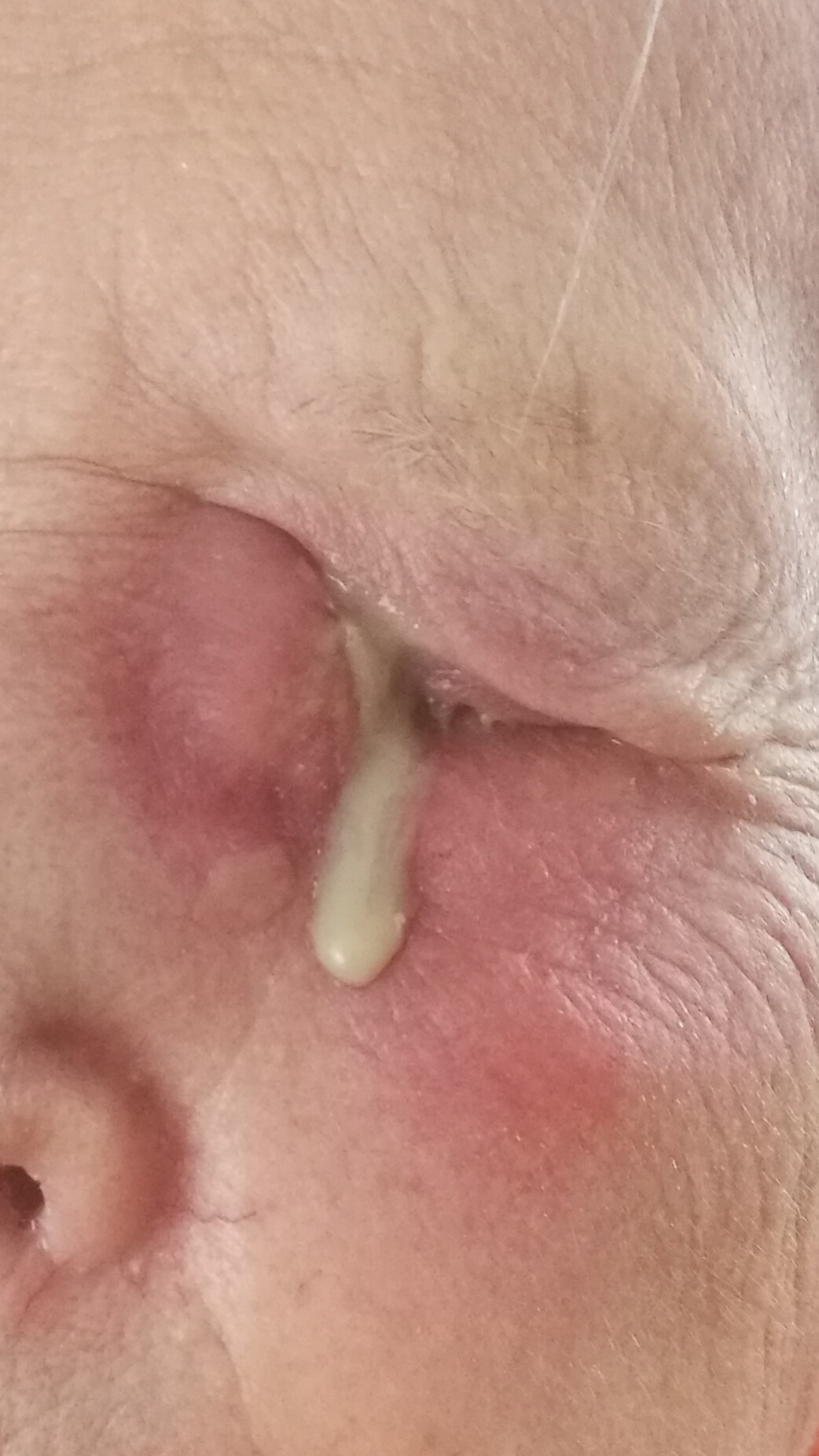
lacrimal sac may extrude pus through the punctum.

== Prognosis ==
About 60 percent of initial attacks of dacryocystitis will recur. Individuals with a poorly functioning immune system (immunocompromised) may develop orbital cellulitis, which may lead to optic neuritis, proptosis, motility abnormalities, or blindness.

== See also ==
- Dacryocystocele
- Canaliculitis
