= Punctoplasty =

- ICD-9-CM: 09.71-09.72

Punctoplasty is a surgical procedure to restore proper drainage of tears when the lacrimal punctum (puncta lacrimalia) becomes blocked in one or both eyes.

If a blockage is present in the puncta, doctors may suggest a procedure called punctoplasty, performed to widen the drain opening. This usually takes 20–30 minutes and is performed under local anesthesia.

== Rationale ==
Tears are produced by the lacrimal gland, situated just outside the eye. Blinking the eyelids distributes the tears to keep the eyes moist, clean and lubricated. Excess tears are drained via the punctum through the tiny channels called canaliculi located on the inner side of the eyes into the tear sac, from there to the tear duct, the nose and finally down the throat.

Epiphora, or watering eyes, is a condition in which tears flow out of the eyes, bypassing the lacrimal puncta. It is primarily caused by excessive tear production (as a result of emotion, irritation or dryness) or blockage of the drainage system. Such a blockage is a common problem among elderly people, as the tear ducts can narrow or get blocked easily. The same condition is also present in newborn babies, as their tear ducts don't open until some time after birth.

== See also ==
- Punctal plug
