= Lacrimal lake =

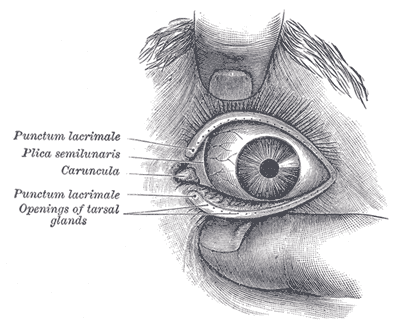
- Front of left eye with eyelids separated to show medial canthus.

Details

Identifiers
- Latin: lacus lacrimalis
- TA98: A15.2.07.063
- TA2: 6852
- FMA: 59402

The lacrimal lake is the pool of tears in the lower conjunctival cul-de-sac, which drains into the opening of the tear drainage system (the puncta lacrimalia). The volume of the lacrimal lake has been estimated to be between 7 and 10 μL.

Although the lacrimal lake usually contains 7–10 μL of tears, the maximum fluid it can usually hold is 25–30 μL before tearing occurs. Aging usually causes the eyelids to become more loose which in turn enables the lacrimal lake to hold even more fluid.

The lacrimal papilla is an elevation located on the medial canthus where the punctum is found.

== See also ==
- Dry eye syndrome
- Lacrimal apparatus
- Medial palpebral commissure
