= Papillitis =

Papillitis is an inflammation of a papilla. Examples include:

- Lingual papillitis, an inflammation of the lingual papillae
  - Foliate papillitis, an inflammation of the foliate papillae
  - Transient lingual papillitis, a transient inflammation of the lingual papillae
- Optic papillitis, an inflammation of the optic disc
