= Imperforate lacrimal punctum =

Congenital disorder in dogs

An imperforate lacrimal punctum is a congenital disorder of dogs involving the lack of an opening to the nasolacrimal duct (tear duct) in the conjunctiva. Dogs normally have two lacrimal puncta, the superior and inferior. This condition can affect either punctum or both. Symptoms include excessive tearing and tear staining of the hair around the eye. Affected breeds include the American Cocker Spaniel, Bedlington Terrier, Golden Retriever, Poodle, and Samoyed. Imperforate lacrimal puncta can be corrected by a surgical opening of the punctum.

== See also ==
- Congenital lacrimal duct obstruction
