= Imperforate =

Imperforate refers to the lack of perforation.

It may also refer to:

- Postage stamp separation by means other than perforation
- Corporeal disorders such as:
  - Imperforate anus
  - Imperforate hymen
  - Imperforate lacrimal punctum
