= Dacryocystocele =

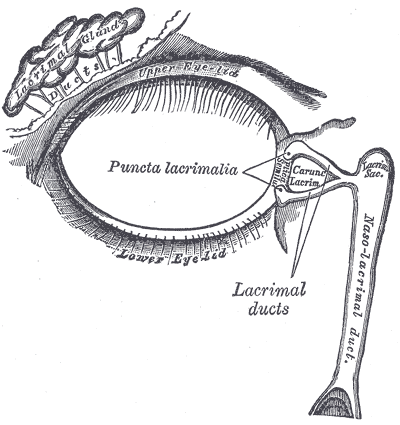
- Nasolacrimal duct
- Specialty: Neurology

Dacryocystocele (Dacryocystitis) or timo cyst is a benign, bluish-gray mass in the inferomedial canthus that develops within a few days or weeks after birth. The uncommon condition forms as a result as a consequence of narrowing or obstruction of the nasolacrimal duct, usually during prenatal development. Nasolacrimal duct obstruction disrupts the lacrimal drainage system, eventually creating a swelling cyst in the lacrimal sac area by the nasal cavity. The location of the cyst can cause respiratory dysfunction, compromising the airway. The obstruction ultimately leads to epiphora, an abundance of tear production.

== Signs and symptoms ==
Dacryocystocele is a condition that can occur to all, at any age. However, the population most affected by this rare condition are infants. The intensity of the symptoms may vary depending on the type of dacryocystocele. There are three types of dacryocystocele: acute, congenital and chronic. Acute dacryocystocele is a bacterial infection, that includes symptoms such as fever and pus from the eye region. While, chronic dacryocystocele is less severe. People with the chronic form of the condition experience symptoms of pain or discomfort from the corner of the eye. Congenital is the dacryocystocele form that appears in infants. The infant may have watering or discharge from the eyes.

Common symptoms of all types of dacryocystocele include:

- Pain surrounding the outer corner of the eye and areas around.
- Redness
- Swelling of the eyelid
- Reoccurring conjunctivitis
- Epiphora (overproduction of tears)
- Pus or discharge
- Fever

=== Complications ===
If the infection is not treated early in the course of the condition, dacryocystocele can lead to life-threatening illnesses:

- Meningitis
- Sepsis
- Orbital cellulitis
- Sinusitis
- Brain abscess

== Cause ==
The nasolacrimal ducts drain the excess tears from our eyes into the nasal cavity. In dacryocystocele this tube gets blocked on either end and as a result when mucoid fluid collects in the intermediate patent section it forms a cystic structure.

The infection is often caused by:

- injury to eye or nose area
- nasal abscess
- abnormal mass inside of the nose
- inflammation
- surgery (nasal or sinus)
- cancer
- sinusitis

== Pathophysiology ==
The nasolacrimal system is located within the maxillary bone. The purpose of the nasolacrimal ducts is to drain tears from the eye area of the lacrimal sac and eventually through the nasal cavity. Dacryocystocele is caused by blockage on the nasolacrimal duct, as a result when mucoid fluid collects in the intermediate patent section it forms a cystic structure. The cyst is formed by the eye and nose region. A blockage of epiphora can become an area for infections to take over. Once an infection occurs, the lacrimal sac will inflame causing swelling and the cystic formation.

== Diagnosis ==
The diagnosis can be made prenatally; routine obstetric ultrasound can identify the characteristic hypoechoic lesion inferior and medial to the globe. It is important to distinguish a dacrocystocele from the more serious encephalocele, which is a neural tube defect.

A dacryocystocele can be diagnosed postpartum with a non-invasive ultrasound (US).

Among the adult population, several tests can be ordered to further diagnose the condition. Initially, a physician would use a patient's medical history or any visible symptoms that can indicate of having the condition. Tests that are used to diagnose a patient include:

- Examination of discharge from the eye
- Blood culture
- X-ray (can help diagnose skeletal abnormality)
- CT Scan (useful in suspected cases of mass)
- Dacryocystography (DCG)
- Nasal endoscopy
- Dye disappearance test: indicates if there is blockage in the eye

== Treatment ==
To relieve dacryocystocele symptoms, a warm compress is placed on the affected area to help open up the ducts. Taking over the counter medication, such as anti-inflammatory and pain relievers are recommended in order to reduce fever and pain symptoms.

Since dacryocystocele is an infection of the tear sacs, the condition is resolved by taking oral antibiotics. With acute dacryocystocele the mass may spontaneously resolve or with pressure directed toward the nose. With time the cyst will outgrow the blockage. However, with chronic dacryocystocele, the nasolacrimal duct probing may be required to open the obstruction. Surgery may be needed to widen the tear ducts in order to reduce the blockage occurring in the eye area. The procedure for the surgery is called dacryocystorhinostomy, laser is used to remove some of the bone structure on the nose in order to widen the tear duct.

== Prognosis ==
Recovery for acute dacryocystocele would be a couple of days to 2 weeks, with the help of antibiotics. However, with chronic dacryocystocele recovery time varies. This recovery time all depends if the person with chronic dacryocystocele receives surgery for the condition. Recovery time for the surgery (specifically DCR), is between three and six months. The success rate of the surgery is 93%- 97%.

Mortality and morbidity rates with this condition are significantly low. This condition can have a high success rate if treated early, particularly among infants with congenital dacryocystocele.

== Epidemiology ==
Dacryocystocele is most prominent among infants, the prevalence is 1 in 3884 live births.

90% of the infants with the condition recover by the time they turn a year old. Among the adult population, those 40 years old and older are more likely to develop the condition, especially women. 75% percent of dacryocystocele cases in adult are from women. Women have narrower nasal ducts than men, and are more prone to develop the condition.

Dacryocystocele becomes more prevalent among people with the following pre-existing conditions:

- Deviated septum
- Rhinitis

== Research Directions ==
In 2018, a research study was conducted in Northwest Iran among patients with dacryocystocele. The purpose of the research experiment was to examine bacterial and antibiotic susceptibility among the group with the condition. A total of 129 patients with dacryocystitis participated in the study. Patients under the age of eighteen needed written consent for participation. All patients that were referred to the clinic of ophthalmology were selected to participate, exclusion for participation was taken into consideration if the patient had previous treatment with antibiotics.

In order to go forward with the study, nasolacrimal duct discharges were injected into growth medium to isolate and determine microbial agent stains present in the discharges. To test the antibiotic susceptibility among dacryocystocele patients a disc diffusion method was utilize.

From the 129 patients that participated in the experiment, 83 were female and 46 were male patients. Results from the culture sample demonstrated that S. aureus, S. epidermidis, and S. pneumonaie were the most common strains of microorganisms among patients with actue dacryocystitis. However, patients with chronic dacryocystitis, they demonstrated prevalence among the S. epidermidis, Pseudomonas spp., S aureus, and C. albicans strains.

Results from the antibiotic susceptibility tests demonstrated that patients in the Northwest region of Iran were most sensitive to the following antibiotics: ciprofloxacin, ceftriaxone, vancomycin, chloramphenicol, gentamicin, and erythromycin. It is concluded that ciprofloxacin and vancomycin are the most effective medications among the patients with the condition in the region of Iran. This study was beneficial to determine which medications worked best to treat the people of Northwest Iran more adequately. Other regions around the world should take consideration of this study in order to treat dacryocystocele effectively in their regions.
