= Conjunctivochalasis =

Excess folds of the conjunctiva of the eye

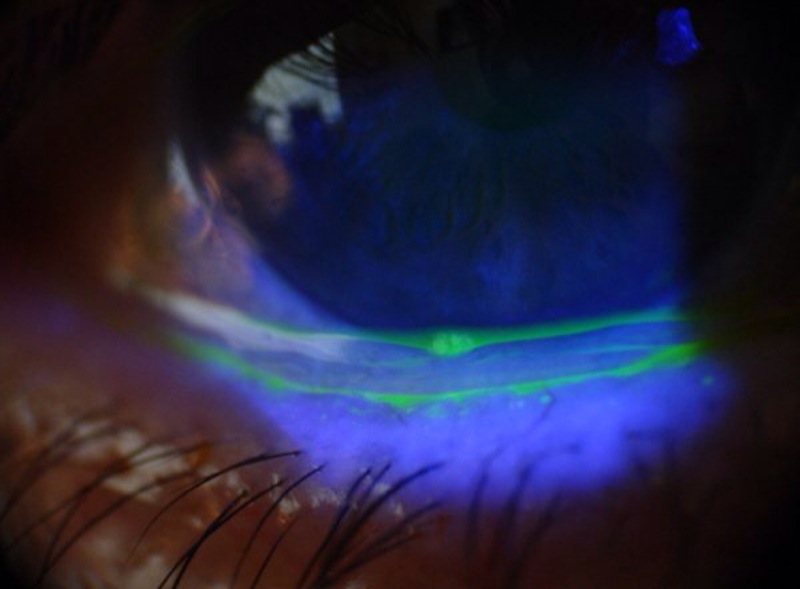
- An eye with conjunctivochalasis
- Specialty: Ophthalmology

Conjunctivochalasis, also known as mechanical dry eye (MDE), is a common eye surface condition characterized by the presence of excess folds of the conjunctiva located between the globe of the eye and the eyelid margin.

== Symptoms and signs ==
Symptoms range from dry eye, epiphora and irritation to localized pain, foreign body sensation, subconjunctival hemorrhage and ulceration. Symptoms are often made worse by vigorous blinking.

== Causes ==
Most conjunctivochalasis is thought to be caused by both a gradual thinning and stretching of the conjunctiva that accompanies age and a loss of adhesion between the conjunctiva and underlying sclera as the result of dissolution of Tenon's capsule. The resulting loose, excess conjunctiva may mechanically irritate the eye and disrupt the tear film and its outflow, leading to dry eye and excess tearing. A correlation may also exist between inflammation in the eye and conjunctivochalasis, though it is unclear whether this correlation is causal. Conjunctivochalasis may be associated with previous surgery, blepharitis, meibomian gland disorder (MGD), Ehlers–Danlos syndrome and aqueous tear deficiency.

== Diagnosis ==
Because the disorder often occurs in people with typical dry eye symptoms, it can be difficult to readily distinguish the discomfort caused by the dry eye from that directly related to the redundant conjunctiva.

Mechanical dry eye should not be confused with aqueous tear deficiency dry eye or delayed tear clearance. Mechanical dry eye patients complain of blurry vision and pain that tend to be worse when looking down such as while reading. Dryness in aqueous tear deficiency dry eye patients tends to be worse as the day progresses due to progressive exposure. Frequent blinking exacerbates mechanical dry eye symptoms, while increasing blinking improves symptoms of aqueous tear deficiency dry eye.

Diagnosis can be further made under a slit lamp upon the observation of redundant conjunctival folds. These folds can be made more apparent by staining with fluorescein dye and by applying gentle upward pressure with a finger to the eyeball through the lower lid. In pure aqueous tear deficiency dry eye patients, fluorescein stains in the interpalpebral exposure zone. In mechanical dry eye patients, fluorescein staining can be seen by pulling down the lower lid spread to the non-exposure zone. A tear-clearance test can also detect irregularities in the tear film.

Diagnosis can also be made by measuring the replenishment of the tear meniscus. The test can be done as follows: Apply 5 μl of fluorescein to the base of the inferior fornix, maximally deplete the lower tear meniscus by a capillary tube or Weckcel sponge, and then monitor the recovery of the tear meniscus height with or without blinking^{.} Patients with mechanical dry eye detectable within 3–8 seconds without blinking or within 0.5–1.5 seconds with blinking.

== Treatment ==
Mild conjunctivochalasis can be asymptomatic and in such cases does not require treatment. Lubricating eye drops may be tried but are often ineffective.

If discomfort persists after standard dry eye treatment and anti-inflammatory therapy, surgery may be undertaken to remove the conjunctival folds and restore a smooth tear film. This conjunctivoplasty surgery to correct conjunctivochalasis typically involves resection of an ellipse-shaped segment of conjunctiva just inferior to the lower lid margin, and is usually followed either by suturing or amniotic membrane graft transplantation to close the wound.

Further techniques have been developed, such as reservoir restoration, which aim to replace the degenerated Tenon's, deepen the inferior fornix to restore the normal anatomy and physiology, and facilitate restoration of the normal tear film^{.} In this surgical procedure, a crescent-shaped area of the conjunctiva is recessed along a limbal peritomy with a maximum anterior-posterior width no more than 3 mm. Diseased and dissolved Tenon's are undermined leaving a large bare scleral defect. Cryopreserved amniotic membrane is slid over the scleral bed with fibrin glue and tucked under the conjunctiva to recreate the fornix. Immediately postop, the surgeon should note an improved anatomical definition and deepening of the inferior fornix.
