= Gingival fibroma =

- Specialty: Dermatology

Gingival fibroma is a cutaneous condition that may be observed with another condition, tuberous sclerosis.

== See also ==
- Eruptive lingual papillitis
- List of cutaneous conditions
