= Lacrimal papilla =

Part of the eyelid

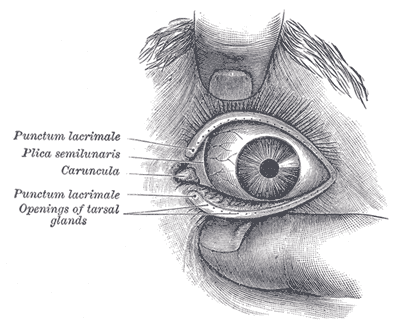
- Front of left eye with eyelids separated to show medial canthus. (Lacrimal papilla not labeled, but region visible.)

Details

Identifiers
- Latin: papilla lacrimalis
- TA98: A15.2.07.064
- TA2: 6853
- FMA: 59407

The lacrimal papilla is the small rise in the bottom (inferior) and top (superior) eyelid just before it ends at the corner of the eye closest to the nose. At the medial edge of it is the lacrimal punctum, a small hole that lets tears drain into the inside of the nose through the lacrimal canaliculi.

In medical terms, the lacrimal papilla is a small conical elevation on the margin of each eyelid at the basal angles of the lacrimal lake. Its apex is pierced by a small orifice, the lacrimal punctum, the commencement of the lacrimal canaliculi.

It is otherwise known commonly as simply the 'tear duct'.

== See also ==
- Papilla (disambiguation)
