= Frontal sinus trephination =

Frontal sinus trephination is a surgical procedure wherein a small opening is made in the floor of the frontal sinus, above the inner canthus, to facilitate drainage of its contents.

== History ==
According to the Museum of Us in San Diego, California, a set of 70 trepanned skulls were found in Peru, which were scraped, drilled or cut for medical or spiritual purposes. This procedure was used during prehistoric times.

== Technique ==
In case of refractory frontal sinus disease, endoscopic access is not possible. A combination of external frontal sinus trephination and intranasal endoscopy is used to approach the frontal sinus. Frontal sinus trephination also enhances the visualization in anatomy. The incision is made in the medial aspect of the eyebrow above, parallel to the hair line. A 4–5mm diameter hole is drilled into the anterior table of the sinus. The best location of the trephine is the floor of sinus or through the brow ridge. If there is possibility of development of osteomyelitis, the trephine is made inferiorly. Precaution is taken not to injure the supraorbital nerve. The pus cultured and irrigated, and the sinus is cleared with a saline or an antibiotic solution. Extra holes are cut in two pieces of French red Robinson rubber catheter or Silastic tubing. The two tubing pieces are inserted through trephine and sutured. An alternative method is the minitrephine system manufactured by Medtronic, in which a metal cannula is wedged firmly into a hole.

== Indications ==
In a case of acute sinusitis, trephination can be used when a patient is not responding completely to medical management. During endoscopic sinus surgery, it can be used to identify the frontal sinus opening inside the nasal cavity. Endoscopically, it is detected by visualizing flushed fluorescein dye into the nasal cavity. This process is a method to detect the frontal sinus outflow tract. In some cases after endoscopic sinus surgery, frontal sinus trephining is indicated in order to prevent stenosis of frontal sinus infundibulum by passing down a catheter into the frontal recess. Following endoscopic frontal sinus surgery, frontal sinus trephination can be used for instillation of medications like topical antibiotics and steroid irrigation.

== Complications ==
The most common complication of frontal sinus trephination are cellulitis, brain damage due to penetration of the posterior table of the frontal sinus, and middle shift orbital complications.

Trephination of the frontal sinus is a safe procedure, though precautions must be taken.
