= Drainage (disambiguation) =

Drainage is the natural or artificial removal of a surface's water and sub-surface water from an area with excess water.

Drainage may also refer to:

- Acid mine drainage
- Drainage basin
- Drainage gallery
- A surgical procedure, see Incision and drainage

== Anatomical ==
- Bile drainage
- Lymphatic drainage
- Pleural drainage
- Tear drainage system
