= Punctal plug =

Medical device to block the tear ducts

A punctal plug, also known as tear duct plug or lacrimal plug, is a small medical device that is inserted into the tear duct (lacrimal puncta) of an eye to block the duct. This prevents the drainage of liquid from the eye. They are used to treat dry eye.

Artificial tears are usually still required after punctal plug insertion.

== Types ==
A temporary punctal occlusion can be inserted and tried first. These are made of collagen and are dissolvable. This is to ascertain that permanent ones will not cause excessive tearing (lacrimation).

Permanent punctal plugs are usually made of silicone. These are available in various sizes. For maximum effectiveness, the largest size that fits should be used. These are more effective than collagen plugs. They can sometimes become loose and fall out, in which case they can be replaced.

Some plugs are made of thermally reactive material. Some of these are inserted into the punctum as a liquid, and then harden and conform to the individual's drainage system. Others start out rigid and become soft and flexible, adapting to the individual's punctal size after they are inserted.

== Risks ==
The risks of punctal plugs are fairly small. There is a risk of eye irritation, excessive tearing (lacrimation), and, in rare cases, infection.

A large silicone plug can cause slight pain upon blinking after insertion. This discomfort may stop within a week.

== Efficacy ==
A systematic review by the Cochrane Collaboration sought to assess the safety and efficacy of punctal plugs for the management of dry eye. The review included eighteen studies, testing punctal plugs of different materials, and comparing them to other treatments for dry eye. Overall there were mixed results; punctal plugs did not show consistent improvement of dry eye symptoms compared to the comparison group at follow-up. There was little evidence of differences between silicone and collagen or acrylic punctal plugs. Punctal plugs may be more effective than oral pilocarpine, but may be less effective than artificial tears. Some adverse outcomes from participants included spontaneous plug loss, epiphora, ocular irritation, foreign body sensation, and local inflammatory reaction.

== Alternatives ==
If punctal plugs are at least partly effective, thermal, electric or radiofrequency (RF) cauterization of puncta can be performed with local sedation. RF cauterization is an electrosurgery office procedure that can be performed by an oculoplastic eye surgeon using a hyfrecator. Before the cauterization, the surgeon tests for the effectiveness of the local sedation. Depending upon the type and depth of the cauterization, it is effective for a few months to a few years, by which time the puncta can possibly regrow and reopen. In this case, cauterization can be repeated. It initially offers complete closure of the duct. It also obviates the need for a punctal plug. It is performed for one punctum per appointment. Depending on the need, it can eventually be done for all four puncta.

Cauterization can result in temporary redness for a few hours which is caused by the avoidable use of a protective cover over the eye. Any lasting sensitivity as a result of this cover can be reversed using short-term use of steroid eye drops such as those containing loteprednol.

== Other indications for use ==
- Sjögren syndrome for management/treatment of dry eyes

== See also ==
- Punctoplasty, i.e. widening of puncta
