= Dacryoadenitis =

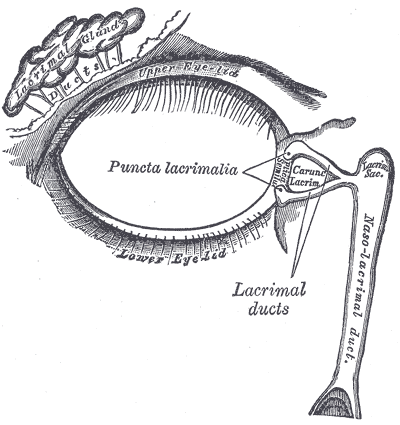
- Lacrimal gland(upper left)
- Specialty: Ophthalmology

Dacryoadenitis is inflammation of the lacrimal glands.

== Symptoms and signs ==
- Swelling of the outer portion of the upper lid, with possible redness and tenderness
- Pain in the area of swelling
- Excess tearing or discharge
- Swelling of lymph nodes in front of the ear

=== Complications ===
Swelling may be severe enough to put pressure on the eye and distort vision. Some patients first thought to have dacryoadenitis may turn out to have a malignancy of the lacrimal gland.

== Causes ==
Acute dacryoadenitis is most commonly due to viral or bacterial infection. Common causes include mumps, Epstein-Barr virus, staphylococcus, and gonococcus.

Chronic dacryoadenitis is usually due to noninfectious inflammatory disorders. Examples include sarcoidosis, thyroid eye disease, and orbital pseudotumor.

== Diagnosis ==
Dacryoadenitis can be diagnosed by examination of the eyes and lids. Special tests such as a CT scan may be required to search for the cause. Sometimes biopsy will be needed to be sure that a tumor of the lacrimal gland is not present.

== Prevention ==
Mumps can be prevented by immunization. Gonococcus, bacteria can be avoided by the use of condoms. Most other causes cannot be prevented.

== Treatment ==
If the cause of dacryoadenitis is a viral condition such as mumps, simple rest and warm compresses may be all that is needed. For other causes, the treatment is specific to the causative disease.

== Prognosis ==
Most patients will fully recover from dacryoadenitis. For conditions with more serious causes, such as sarcoidosis, the prognosis is that of the underlying condition.
