= Epiphora (medicine) =

Outflow of tears from the eye without crying

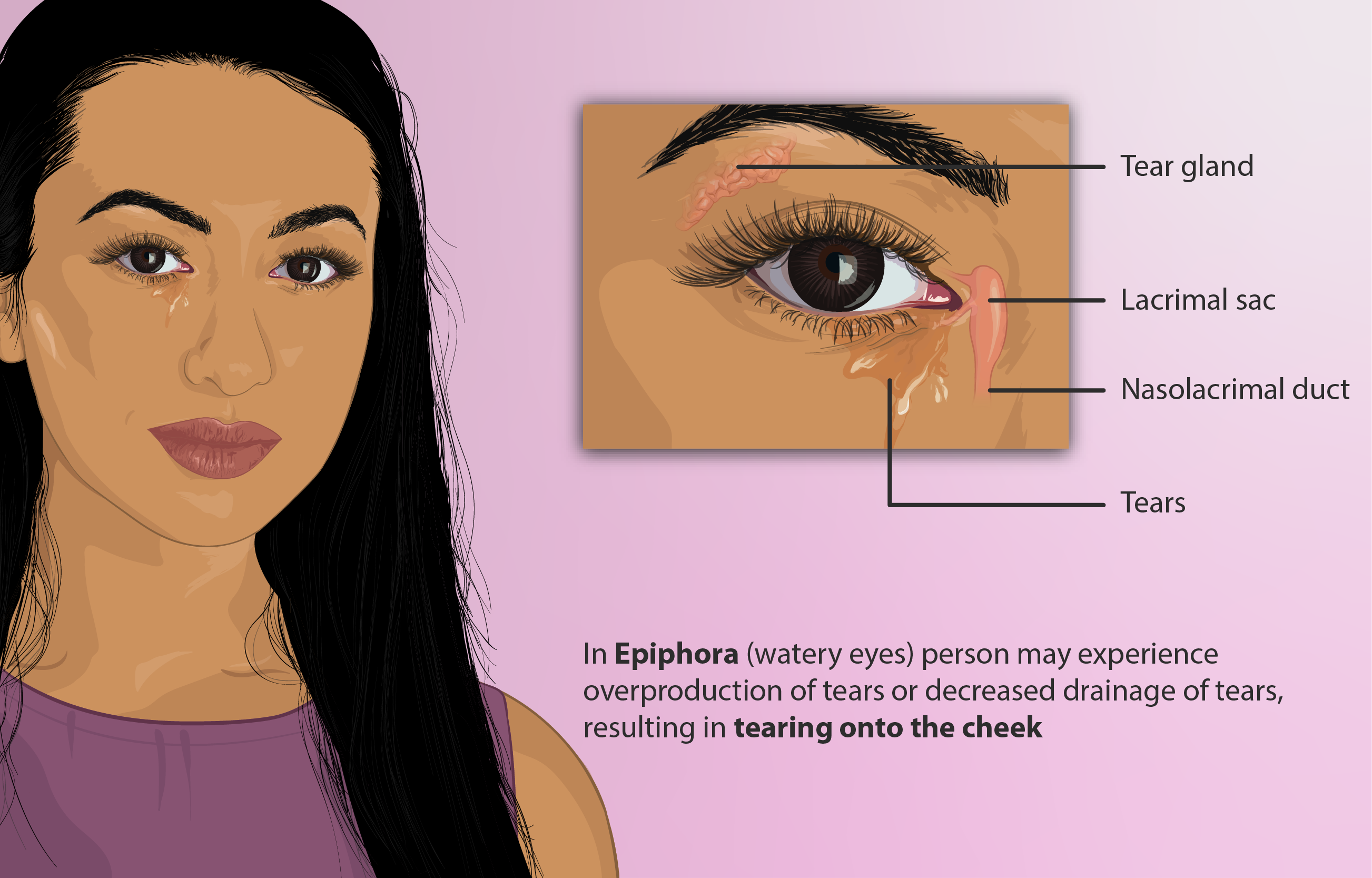
- Specialty: Ophthalmology

Epiphora is an overflow of tears onto the face, other than caused by normal crying. It is a clinical sign or condition that constitutes insufficient tear film drainage from the eyes, in that tears will drain down the face rather than through the nasolacrimal system.

== Cause ==
Causes of epiphora are any that cause either overproduction of tears or decreased drainage of tears, resulting in tearing onto the cheek. This can be due to ocular irritation and inflammation (including trichiasis and entropion) or an obstructed tear outflow tract, which is divided according to its anatomical location (i.e., ectropion, punctal, canalicular or nasolacrimal duct obstruction). The latter is often due to aging (a spontaneous process), conjunctivochalasis, infection (i.e. dacryocystitis), rhinitis, and in neonates or infants, failure of the nasolacrimal duct to open.

Another cause could be poor reconstruction of the nasolacrimal duct system after trauma to the area. Cause of trauma could be facial fractures (including nasoethmoid fractures or maxillary Le Fort fractures), and soft-tissue trauma involving the nose and/or the eyelid. This condition is often frustrating or irritating.

A systematic review studying the usage of punctal plugs for treatment of dry eye reported a few cases of epiphora among participants.

== Diagnosis ==
Diagnosis of epiphora is clinical by history presentation and observation of the lids.

Fluorescein dye can be used to examine for punctal reflux by pressing on the canaliculi in which the clinician should note resistance of reflux as it irrigates through the punctum into the nose. Dacryoscintigraphy is an imaging method used to detect obstructions in the lacrimal apparatus.

== Management ==
If epiphora is caused by ectropion or entropion, lid repair is indicated. Punctal irrigation is also required. In infants with nasolacrimal defects, a nasolacrimal duct probe is used and a tube replacement, either temporary (Crawford) or permanent (Jones), is carried out. A surgical procedure called a dacryocystorhinostomy is done to join the lacrimal sac to the nasal mucosa in order to restore lacrimal drainage.
