= Silastic =

Trademark for inert silicone elastomer

Silastic (a portmanteau of 'silicone' and 'plastic') is a trademark registered in 1948 by Dow Corning Corporation for flexible, inert silicone elastomer.

== Composition ==
The Silastic trademark refers to silicone elastomers, silicone tubing and some cross-linked polydimethylsiloxane materials manufactured by Dow Corning, the owner of the global trademark.

== Applications ==
Silastic-brand silicone elastomers have a range of applications. In the automotive industry they are used for making gaskets, spark plug boots, hoses and other components that must operate over a broad temperature range and resist oil and coolants. The elastomers are widely used in the architectural, aerospace, electronic, food and beverage, textile, and transportation industries for molding, coating, adhesion and sealing. Due to their inert nature, medical-grade Silastic-brand silicone elastomers are important materials in numerous medical and pharmaceutical devices including catheters, pacemaker leads, tubing, wound dressings, silos for abdominal wall defects, and nasolacrimal duct obstruction. These medical-grade elastomers are also used in the manufacture of hyper-realistic masks, where they perfectly mimic the texture of human skin and follow all facial movements and expressions.
