= Papilla =

Papilla (Latin, 'nipple') or papillae may refer to:

== In animals ==
- Papilla (fish anatomy), in the mouth of fish
- Certain surface structures on a number of worms are called "papilla". The worms with this feature are:
  - Bristle worms
  - Thread worms
  - Velvet worms
- Basilar papilla, a sensory organ of lizards, amphibians and fish
- Dental papilla, in a developing tooth
- Dermal papillae, part of the skin structure
- Major duodenal papilla, in the duodenum
- Minor duodenal papilla, in the duodenum
- Genital papilla, a feature of the external genitalia of some animals
- Mammary papilla or nipple, a raised region of tissue on the surface of the breast
- Interdental papilla, part of the gums
- Lacrimal papilla, on the bottom eyelid
- Lingual papillae, small structures on the upper surface of the tongue
- Renal papilla, part of the kidney
- Tumor papilla, consisting of tumor cells surrounding a fibrovascular core

== In plants and fungi ==
- Papilla (mycology), a nipple-shaped protrusion in the center of the cap
- Stigmatic papilla, part of the stigma (botany)

== See also ==
- Blister, a small pocket of body fluid within the upper layers of the skin
- Papillary muscle, a muscle in the heart
- Papilloma, a benign epithelial tumor
- Papule, a circumscribed, solid elevation of skin with no visible fluid
