= Nasolacrimal duct cyst =

- Specialty: Dermatology

Nasolacrimal duct cysts are a cutaneous condition that is a developmental defect present at birth.

== See also ==
- Skin dimple
- List of cutaneous conditions
