= Rougine =

Surgical instrument

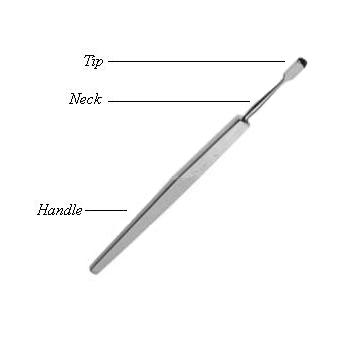
A Rougine and its parts

A rougine is an instrument used in Ophthalmology.

== Description ==
It consists of a small rectangular blade, with a curved cutting edge; one of its surfaces is beveled, the other is flat. It is connected to a handle by a narrow neck.

== Uses ==
It is used when operating on the lacrimal sac, to separate it from the lacrimal fossa.

== See also ==
- Instruments used in general surgery
