= Transient lingual papillitis =

- Other names: Fungiform papillary glossitis, Eruptive lingual papillitis, Lie bumps),
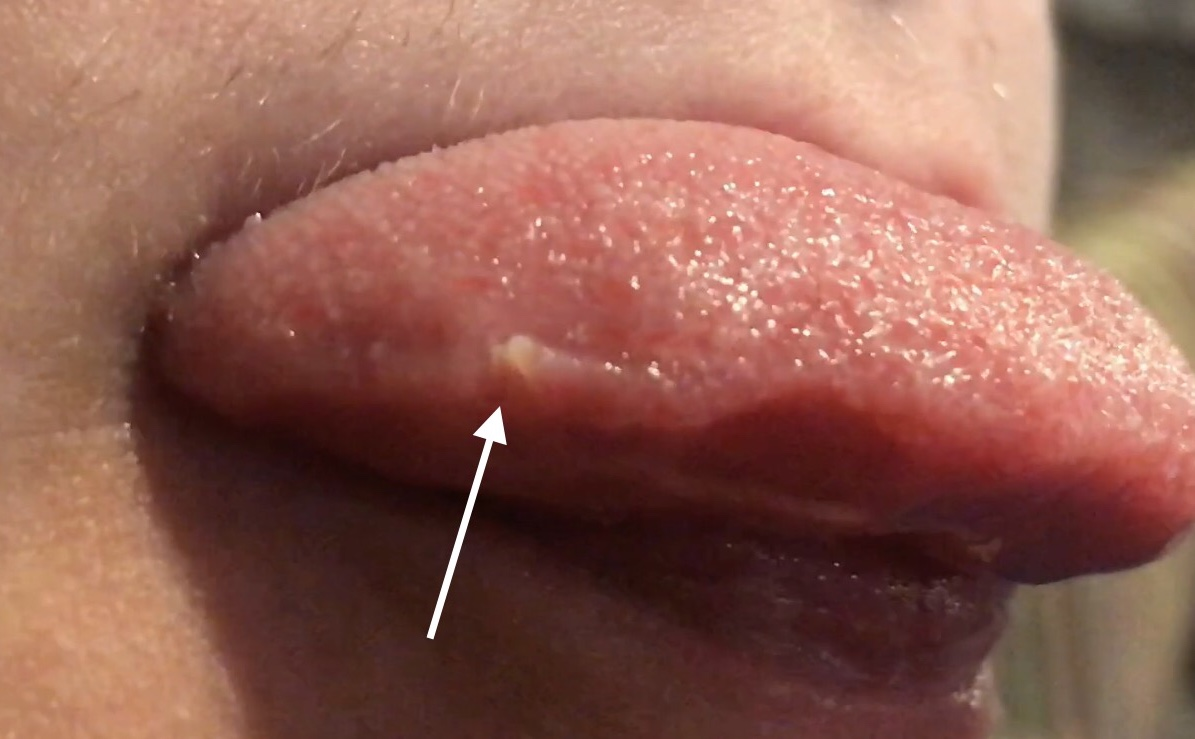

Transient lingual papillitis (TLP) is a medical term for painful, hypertrophic, red, and white lingual papillae on the tongue. TLP is also called lie bumps and fungiform papillary glossitis. This condition has four types: classic form, transient u-shaped lingual papillitis, papulokeratotic variant, and eruptive lingual papillitis. TLP can occur in early childhood and can come back from time to time due to various causes that include stress, spicy foods, poor oral hygiene, and dental work. TLP can be diagnosed at the dentist's office, and treatments are provided only to help manage or decrease the symptoms. This condition normally lasts 1-2 days, but depending on the type it can last up to 15 days. In folklore, it was said if someone was caught telling a lie, a bump was formed on their tongue and if there were a lot of bumps, then it made that person a compulsive liar.

== Cause ==
Transient lingual papillitis can affect males and females as early as 8 years of age. In many cases, the cause is unknown. Some dental professionals believe the inflammation is due to chronic irritation from teeth, fillings, or dental appliances. Body changes, stress, poor nutrition, smoking, and alcohol use may also be initiating factors.

== Diagnosis ==
Transient lingual papillitis is generally diagnosed based on patient presentation, meaning where it is located in the mouth and how big the bump is. The visual presentation can also accompany various signs and symptoms such as difficulty eating, having a "strawberry tongue", increased saliva production, and a burning or tingling sensation. The dentist will go over the patient's medical history and ask what type of foods have been recently eaten and determine what kind of toothpaste and mouthwash have been recently used, as these factors can help to determine why TLP occurred. Depending on how severe the tongue looks, and how long the pain has been persisting, the dentist will take a tongue biopsy to see if any underlying bacteria or viruses are causing TLP.

== Types ==
=== Classic form ===
This type has one or two reddish or white bumps near or on the tip of the tongue. This condition can last from a few hours to 2 days, and it usually resolves without treatment.

=== Papulokeratotic variant ===
This type is non-painful and presents with white bumps all over the tongue. This condition can reoccur frequently. There is no established cause as to why the variant reoccurs, however, environmental factors such as stress can upsurge the frequency of this variant.

=== Transient U-shaped lingual papillitis ===
It is suggested that this type can occur from having SARS-CoV-2, oxygen therapy, or poor oral hygiene care. These bumps will occur on the dorsal and anterior part of the tongue and come with tongue swelling.

=== Eruptive lingual papillitis ===
This type may be contagious and is very painful with red and white bumps all over the tongue. This condition can last up to 15 days and may be associated with swollen lymph nodes and a fever. This is more prevalent in children than adults.

== Treatments ==
While there is no pinpoint cure to treat this condition, some items can decrease the pain such as antiseptic mouthwash and saltwater mouth rinses. Corticosteroids or topical steroids, coating medication, and antihistamines could also help alleviate the pain when it first starts. It is advised to practice oral hygiene, especially with children, and to avoid hot and spicy foods to avoid irritations on your tongue and the possibility of TLP reoccurrence.
