= Dacryocystorhinostomy =

Surgical procedure to bypass the tear ducts

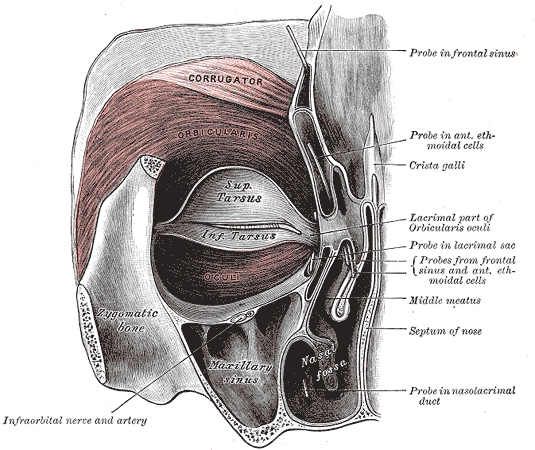
- Left orbicularis oculi, seen from behind.
- ICD-9-CM: 09.81
- MeSH: D003608

Dacryocystorhinostomy (DCR) is a surgical procedure to restore the flow of tears into the nose from the lacrimal sac when the nasolacrimal duct does not function.

== Process ==
=== Traditional ===
A small incision is made on the side of the nose and some bone is removed to make a connection to the nose. Drains are left behind to prevent the gap from becoming closed and are removed after a few months. A Jones or Crawford tube is placed to facilitate the flow of tears from the eye to the nose. The lacrimal sacs must be avoided during this surgical procedure.

=== Endoscopic ===
The operation can also be performed endoscopically through the nose where an opening is fashioned in the lacrimal sac from within the nose. The advantages include lesser peri-operative morbidity, and no scar. Data suggests a slightly lower success rate than the "traditional" technique.

With the advent of nasal endoscopes, endoscopic dacryocystorhinostomy is becoming popular. In this procedure, a nasal endoscope is used to visualise the lacrimal sac through the nasal cavity. The bone covering the lacrimal sac is nibbled out. The medial wall of the sac is incised or excised, facilitating drainage of tears into the nasal cavity. This procedure avoids scarring.

=== Adjunctive use of antimetabolites ===
Antimetabolites have been used with intent to increase the success rates of dacryocystorhinostomy. At a follow-up time of more than six months, antimetabolites may improve functional and anatomic results. The use of antimetabolites had only minor side effects.

== Contraindications ==
Atrophic rhinitis is an absolute contraindication. In case of acute dacryocystitis, this operation can not be done immediately, rather it is done after a period of time. In case of elderly patients (above 70 years of age), dacryocystectomy is preferred to dacryocystorhinostomy as old age naturally causes atrophy in nasal mucosa.

== See also ==
- List of surgeries by type
