= Lacrimal punctum =

Part of human eye anatomy

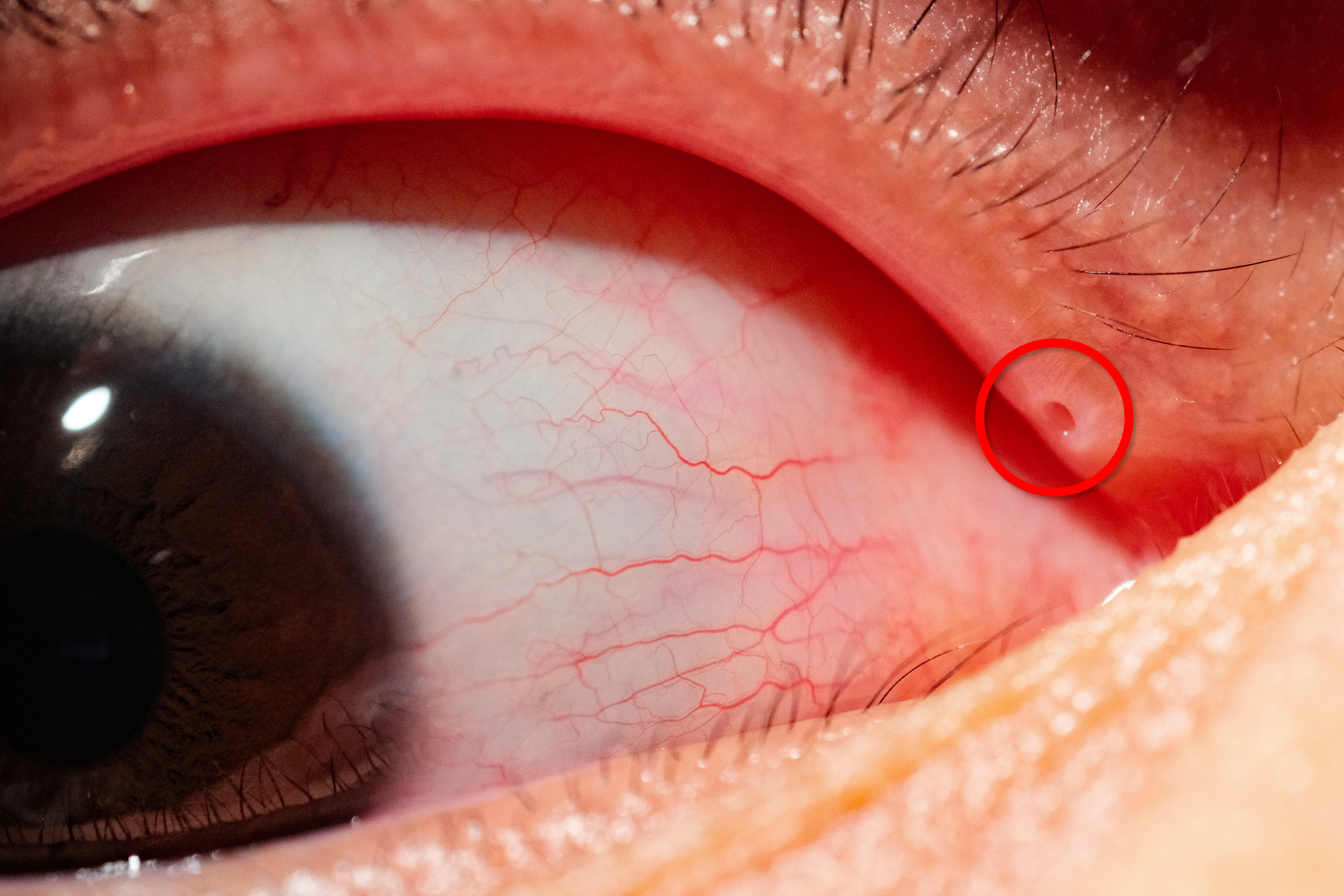
- Macro image of the right upper lacrimal punctum in a male human eye. Eyeball retained for scale.

Details

Identifiers
- Latin: puncta lacrimalia
- TA98: A15.2.07.065
- TA2: 6854
- FMA: 59365

The lacrimal punctum (pl.: puncta) or lacrimal point is a minute opening on the summits of the lacrimal papillae, seen on the margins of the eyelids at the lateral extremity of the lacrimal lake. There are two lacrimal puncta in the medial (inside) portion of each eyelid. Normally, the puncta dip into the lacrimal lake.

Together, they function to collect tears produced by the lacrimal glands. The fluid is conveyed through the lacrimal canaliculi to the lacrimal sac, and thence via the nasolacrimal duct to the inferior nasal meatus of the nasal passage.

The size of the lacrimal punctum varies widely, but it is generally accepted that the lower punctum is wider than the upper one. Additionally, studies have shown that males have wider puncta than females, and among females, those of premenopausal age have wider lacrimal puncta than those of postmenopausal age.

== Clinical significance ==
It is believed that there is a direct correlation between lacrimal punctum size and incidence of dry eyes. In patients with dry eye syndrome, the lacrimal puncta can be blocked using punctal plugs, in an effort to conserve tears and keep the eyes moist.

== Additional images ==
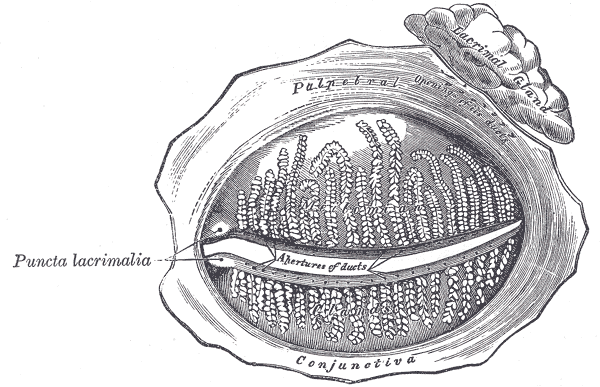
The tarsal glands, etc., seen from the inner surface of the eyelids. (Puncta lacrimalia visible at center left.)

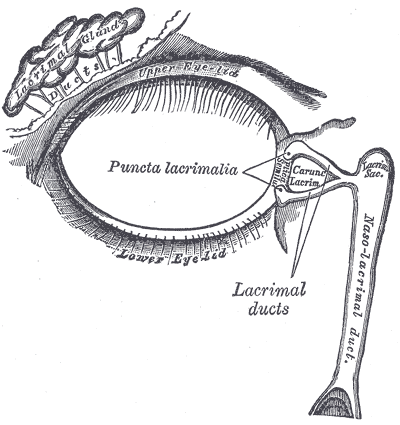
The lacrimal apparatus. Right side. Note outdated terminology: The "Lacrimal ducts" in Gray's are now called "Lacrimal canals".

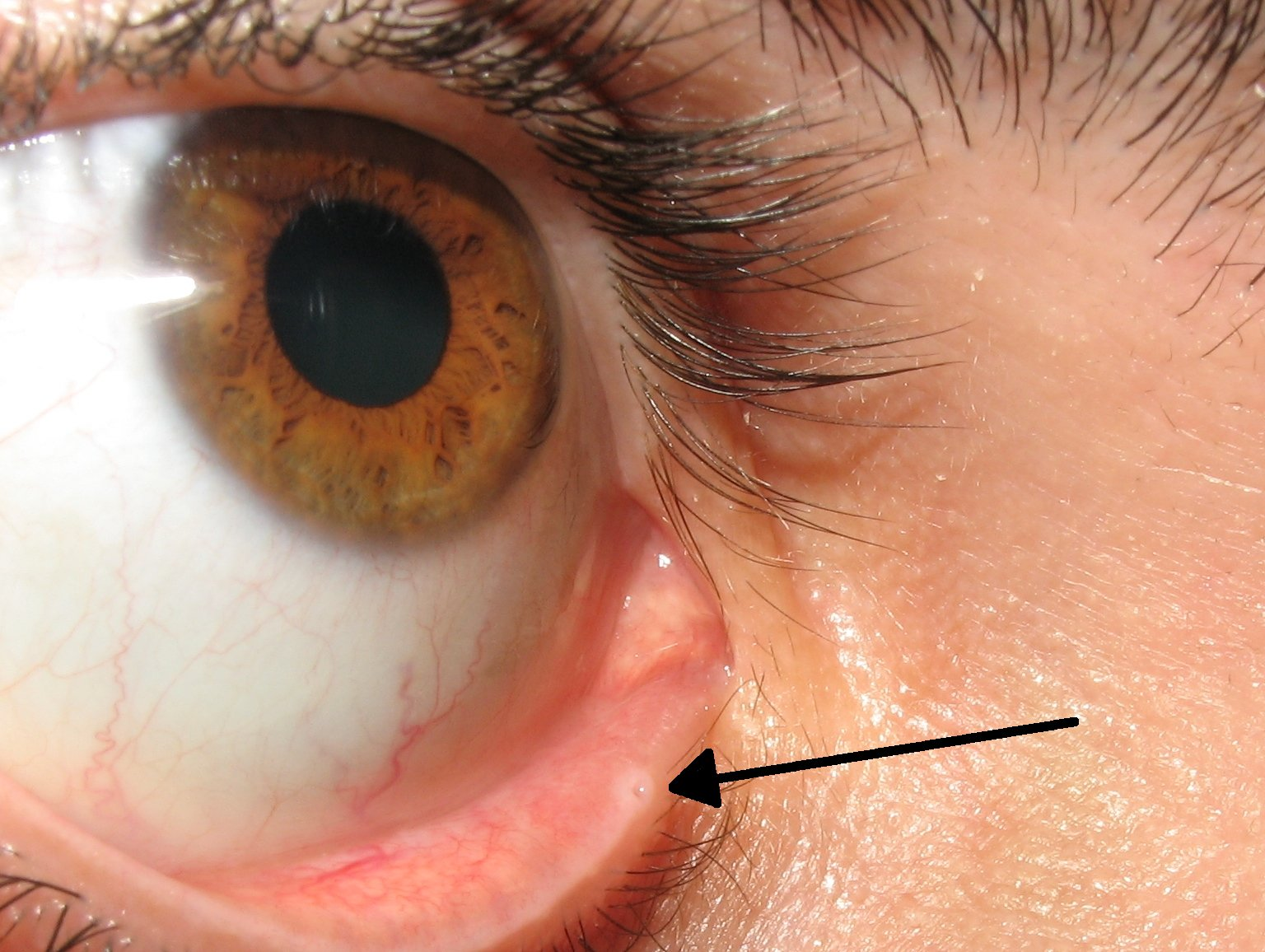
A close up of a lacrimal punctum.

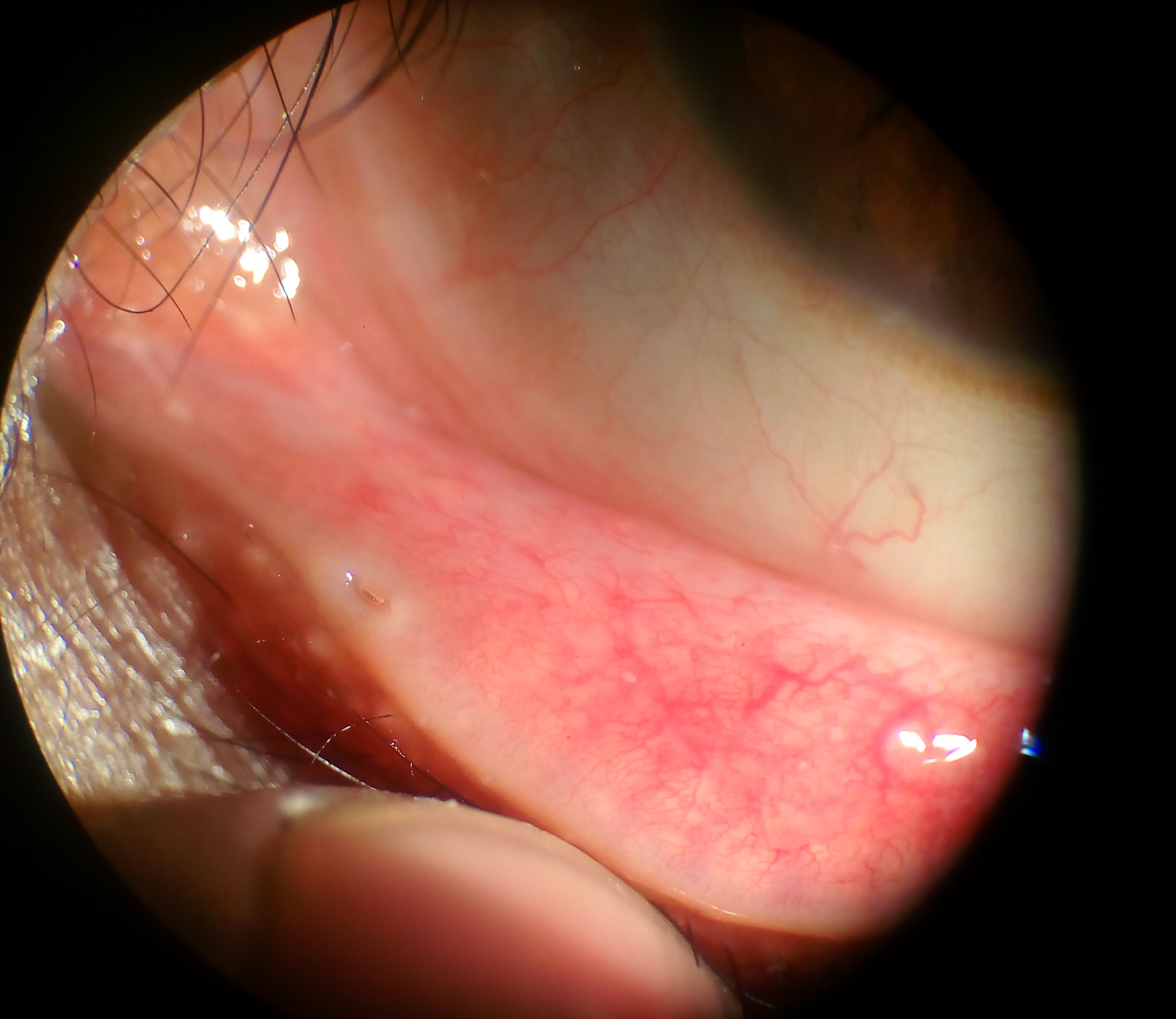
Lower lacrimal punctum through slit lamp biomicroscope

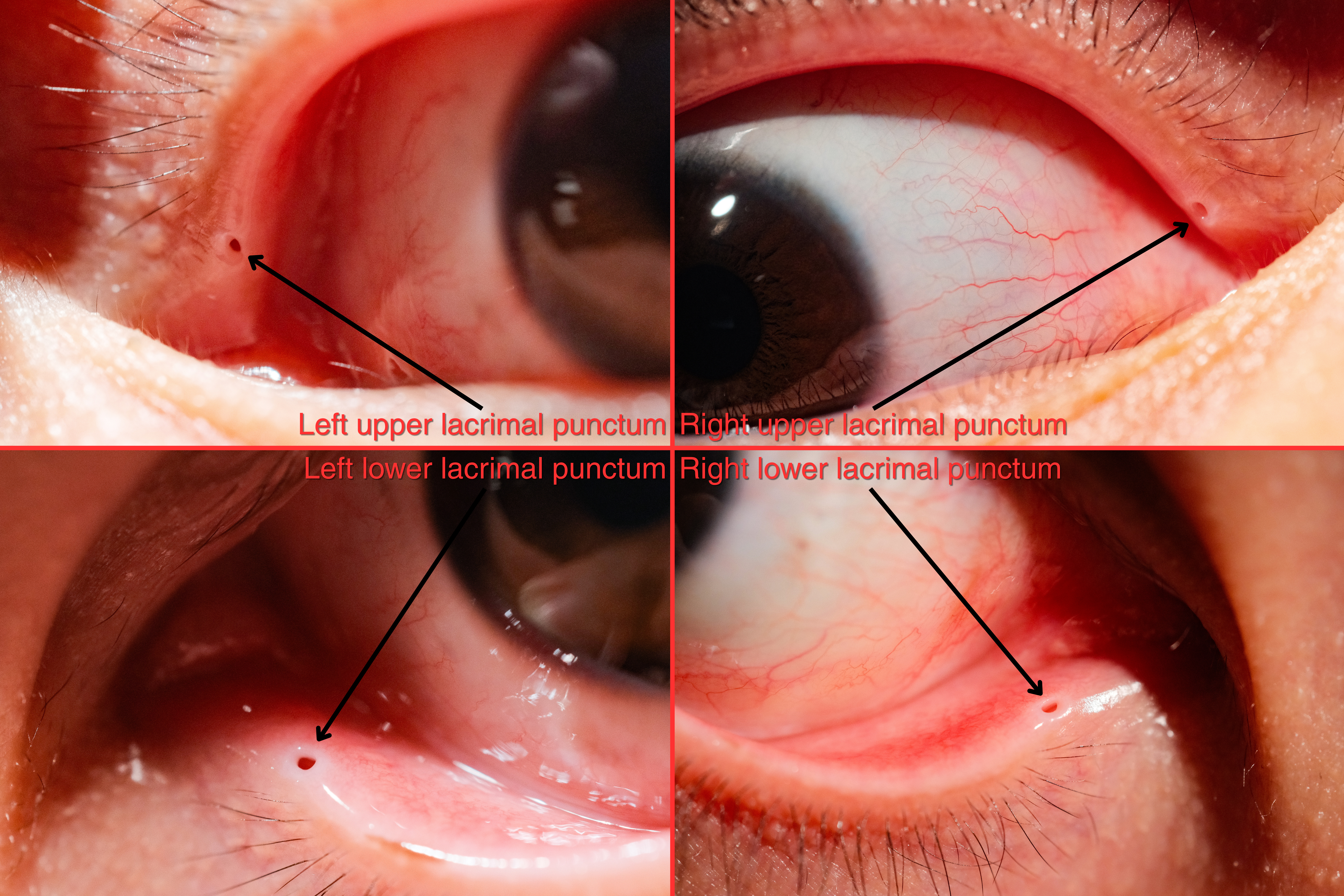
All four lacrimal puncta in the human body, labeled and arranged in a grid

== See also ==
- Imperforate lacrimal punctum
- Lacrimal apparatus
- Punctal plug
