= Lacrimal apparatus =

Physiological system containing the orbital structures for tear production and drainage

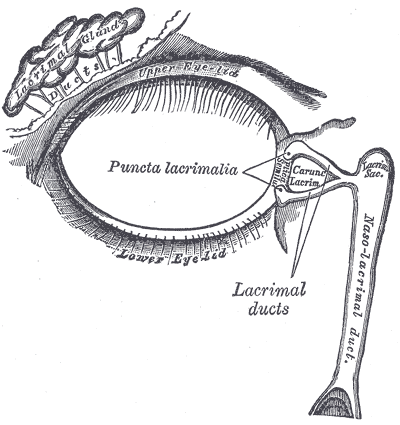
- The lacrimal apparatus

Details

Identifiers
- Latin: apparatus lacrimalis
- MeSH: D007765
- TA98: A15.2.07.056
- TA2: 6845
- FMA: 55605

The lacrimal apparatus is the physiological system containing the orbital structures for tear production and drainage.
It consists of:

- The lacrimal gland, which secretes the tears, and its excretory ducts, which convey the fluid to the surface of the eye; it is a j-shaped serous gland located in lacrimal fossa.
- The lacrimal canaliculi, the lacrimal sac, and the nasolacrimal duct, by which the fluid is conveyed into the cavity of the nose, emptying anterioinferiorly to the inferior nasal conchae from the nasolacrimal duct.
- The innervation of the lacrimal apparatus, which involves both a sympathetic supply through the carotid plexus of nerves around the internal carotid artery, and parasympathetically from the lacrimal nucleus of the facial nerve.

The blood supply to the lacrimal gland is provided by the ophthalmic artery with its branch - the lacrimal artery, while the venous blood is drained from this region via the superior ophthalmic vein. The lacrimal system is made up of a secretory system, which produces tears, and an excretory system, which drains the tears. The lacrimal gland is primarily responsible for producing emotional or reflexive tears. As tears are produced, some fluid evaporates between blinks, and some is drained through the lacrimal punctum. The tears that are drained through the punctum will eventually be drained through the nose. Any excess fluid that did not go into the punctum will fall over the eyelid, which produces tears that are cried.
