= Lacrimal canaliculi =

Small channels in each eyelid that drain lacrimal fluid

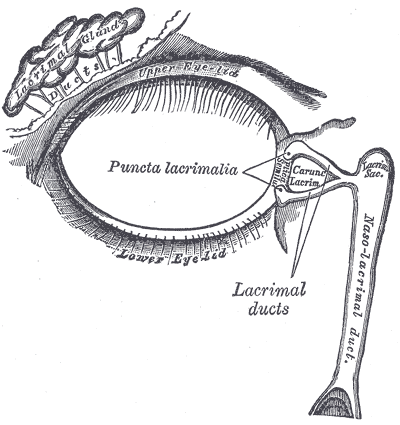
- Diagram of the lacrimal apparatus. The lacrimal canaliculi are labelled as the lacrimal ducts.

Details
- Drains from: Lacrimal puncta
- Drains to: Lacrimal sac

Identifiers
- Latin: canaliculus lacrimalis
- TA98: A15.2.07.066
- TA2: 6855
- FMA: 58245

The lacrimal canaliculi (sg.: canaliculus) are the small channels in each eyelid that drain lacrimal fluid from the lacrimal puncta to the lacrimal sac. This forms part of the lacrimal apparatus that drains lacrimal fluid from the surface of the eye to the nasal cavity.

== Structure ==
There is a single lacrimal canaliculus in each eyelid, a superior lacrimal canaliculus in the upper eyelid and an inferior lacrimal canaliculus in the lower eyelid. The canaliculi travel vertically and then turn medially to travel towards the lacrimal sac. At the bend, the canaliculus is dilated and called the ampulla. Usually, the superior and inferior lacrimal canaliculi join to form a common passage that enters the lateral wall of the lacrimal sac.

=== Superior lacrimal canaliculus ===
The superior lacrimal canaliculus is located in the upper eyelid. It first ascends, then bends medially towards the lacrimal sac. It drains lacrimal fluid from the superior lacrimal punctum. It is smaller and shorter than the inferior lacrimal canaliculus.

=== Inferior lacrimal canaliculus ===
The inferior lacrimal canaliculus is located in the lower eyelid. It first descends, then bends medially towards the lacrimal sac. It drains lacrimal fluid from the inferior lacrimal punctum.

== Histology ==
The lacrimal canaliculi have a mucosa composed of a non-keratinized stratified squamous epithelium on a basement membrane and a highly elastic lamina propria. Surrounding the mucosa are skeletal muscle fibres continuous with the orbicularis oculi which forms a sort of sphincter. This may facilitate the draining of lacrimal fluid during blinking.

== Clinical significance ==
Canaliculitis is inflammation of the lacrimal canaliculus.
