= Krause =

Surname list

Krause (German for ruffle) is a common German surname.

== Geographical distribution ==
As of 2014, 64.9% of all known bearers of the surname Krause were residents of Germany (frequency 1:531), 20.6% of the United States (1:7,541), 3.5% of Brazil (1:24,831), 2.4% of South Africa (1:9,550), 2.1% of Poland (1:7,891), 1.4% of Canada (1:11,446) and 1.2% of Australia (1:8,488).

In Germany, the frequency of the surname was higher than national average (1:531) in the following states:

1. Brandenburg (1:204)
2. Saxony-Anhalt (1:240)
3. Mecklenburg-Vorpommern (1:250)
4. Berlin (1:279)
5. Saxony (1:305)
6. Schleswig-Holstein (1:345)
7. Thuringia (1:388)
8. Lower Saxony (1:448)
9. Bremen (1:464)
10. Hamburg (1:506)

== People ==
- Alan Krause (1931–2023), Australian rules footballer
- Allison Krause (1951–1970), student at Kent State University, Ohio who was shot and killed by the Ohio National Guard
- Arnulf Krause (born 1955), German philologist
- Asuman Krause, German-born former model and singer of mixed Turkish and German descent
- Aurel Krause, (1848–1908), German geographer known today for his early ethnography of the Tlingit Indians of southeast Alaska, brother of Albert Krause and great-granduncle of Tory Bruno
- Axel Krause (born 1958), German painter and graphic artist
- Barbara Krause (born 1959), East German freestyle swimmer
- Beaver & Krause, musical duo made up of Paul Beaver and Bernie Krause
- Benjamin Krause, German rugby union player
- Bernhard Krause, (1910–1945), an Obersturmbannführer in the Waffen SS during World War II
- Bernie Krause (born 1938), an American bioacoustician
- Bob Krause (athletic director) (1945–2015), athletic director at Kansas State University
- Bob Krause (politician) (born 1950), American politician from Iowa
- Brian Krause (born 1969), American actor
- Brigitte Krause (1929–2007), East German actress
- Carolyn H. Krause (born 1938), American politician from Illinois
- Charles I. Krause (1911–2002), American labor union organizer and local executive
- Charles Krause (gymnast), an American gymnast and Olympic medalist
- Cheryl Ann Krause (born 1968), American judge from Pennsylvania
- Chester Krause (1923–2016), American numismatist and publisher
- Christiane Krause (born 1950), German athlete who competed mainly in the 100 metres
- Christopher Krause (born 1984), German footballer
- Dagmar Krause (born 1950), German singer
- Dieter Krause (1936–2020), East German-German sprint canoer
- Dominik Krause (born 1990), German politician (Greens)
- Elisabeth Krause, German-American astronomer
- Ernst Hans Ludwig Krause (1859–1942), German botanist
- Ernst Henry Krause (1913–1989), American nuclear physicist and aerospace executive
- Ernst Krause (disambiguation), several people
  - Ernst Krause (biologist) (1839–1903), German biologist
  - Ernst Krause (entomologist) (1899–1987), German entomologist
  - Ernst Krause (musicologist) (1911–1997), German musicologist
  - Ernst Henry Krause (1913–1989), American physicist
- Fedor Krause (1857–1937), German neurosurgeon who was native of Friedland
- Georg Krause (1901–1986), German cinematographer
- Georg Krause (oologist) (1858–1915), German oologist
- George Krause (born 1937), American artist photographer
- Gérard Krause (born 1965), German epidemiologist
- Gesa Felicitas Krause (born 1992), German athlete
- Greg Krause (born 1976), Arena Football League offensive lineman for the Los Angeles Avengers
- Gundula Krause (born 1966), German folk violinist
- Günther Krause (born 1953), German politician
- Gustavo Krause (born 1946), Brazilian lawyer and politician
- Hans-Henrik Krause (1918–2002), Danish actor and film director
- Harry Krause (1888–1940), professional baseball player
- Helga Krause (1935–1989), German film editor
- Henry Krause (1913–1987), American football offensive lineman
- Horst Krause (1941–2025), German actor
- James Krause (fighter) (born 1986), American mixed martial artist
- James Krause (footballer) (born 1987), English footballer
- Jerry Krause (1939–2017), American basketball scout and general manager
- Johann Gottlob Krause (1760–1802), American master mason
- Johann Wilhelm Krause (botanist) (1764–1842), German botanist
- John Krause (born 1983), American soccer player
- Jon Krause (born 1981), Australian politician from Queensland
- Kai Krause (born 1957), software artist, UI designer and founder of MetaCreations Corp
- Karina Krause (born 1989), Thai volleyball player
- Karl Christian Friedrich Krause (1781–1832), German philosopher
- Karl Friedrich Theodor Krause (1797–1868), German anatomist
- Karl Wilhelm Krause, (1911–2001), SS officer, personal orderly and bodyguard to Adolf Hitler
- Konstantin Krause (born 1967), retired German long jumper
- Lawrence B. Krause (born 1929), American economist
- Martin Krause (mathematician) (1851–1920), German mathematician and university rector
- Martin Krause (1853–1918), German concert pianist, piano teacher and writer on music
- Matt Krause (born 1980), American attorney and politician from Texas
- Max Krause (1909–1984), American football running back
- Mel Krause (1928–2008), American college baseball coach and player at the University of Oregon
- Michael Krause (1946–2024), German field hockey player,
- Mikkel Krause (born 1988), Danish curler
- Moose Krause (1913–1992), collegiate basketball player during the 1930s
- Nadine Krause (born 1982), German handball player
- Nell Krause (1895–1982), American politician from Nebraska, first woman to serve in unicameral legislature
- Orla Hermann Krause (1867–1935), Danish chess master and analyst
- Otto Krause (1856–1920), Argentine engineer and educator
- Paul Krause (born 1942), American football defensive back
- Paul von Krause (1852–1923), German politician
- Peter Krause (born 1965), American film and television actor and film producer
- Peter Krause (artist), American illustrator and comic book artist
- Petra Krause (1939–2025), German-Italian communist militant
- Piet Krause (born 1973), South African rugby union footballer
- Rainelle Krause (1988–2026), American opera singer
- Roswitha Krause (born 1949), German swimmer and team handball player
- Rudolf Krause (1907–1987), racing driver from East Germany
- Ryan Krause (born 1981), American football tight end
- Sharon Krause (born 1966), American philosopher
- Shawn Krause (animator), American animator
- Sigrun Krause (born 1954), former East German cross country skier who competed during the 1970s
- Sonja Krause (1933–2021), Swiss-American polymer chemist
- Tina Krause (born 1970), American actress and model
- Tom Krause (1934–2013), Finnish operatic baritone
- Tom Krause (business executive) (born 1977/78), American corporate executive and civil servant
- Uwe Krause (born 1955), German former footballer
- Wilhelm Krause (anatomist) (1833–1910), German anatomist who was born in Hannover
- Wolf-Rüdiger Krause (born 1944), German football coach and a former player

Krause can also refer to:

- Krause Bottom, a riparian forest area on the Elwha River along the Geyser Valley trail in Olympic National Park, Washington
- Krause Music Store, a two-story building in Chicago, the last commission by architect Louis Sullivan
- Krause Publications, a publisher of magazines and books, especially their series of Standard Catalog of World Coins which are often referred to as the Krause Catalogues
- Krause-Kivlin syndrome, a hereditary syndrome that mainly affects the eyes, growth and development
- Krause's glands, small, mucous accessory lacrimal glands that are found underneath the eyelid where the upper and lower conductive meet
- Bulboid corpuscle, cutaneous receptors in the human body
- Otto Krause Technical School, an educational institution in Buenos Aires, Argentina
- Villa Krause, the city of the Argentine of San Juan in the Cuyo Iowa

== See also ==
- Kraus
- Krauss
- Krauze
- Krausz
