= Kraus =

Kraus is a German-language surname, meaning 'curly'. In addition to German-speaking countries, the surname is commonly found in the United States, Israel, and the Czech Republic (Czech feminine: Krausová). Notable people with the surname include:

== Arts and entertainment ==
- Adalbert Kraus (born 1937), German tenor
- Adolph Robert Kraus (1850–1901), American sculptor
- Alfredo Kraus (1927–1999), Spanish opera singer
- Charles Kraus (clown) (born 1946), American clown, magician, writer and comedian
- Chris Kraus (director) (born 1963), German film director and screen writer
- Chris Kraus (writer) (born 1955), American writer and filmmaker
- Dagmara Kraus (born 1981), German poet and translator
- Daniel Kraus (author) (born 1975), American author
- Detlef Kraus (1919–2008), German pianist
- Ernst Kraus (1863–1941), German tenor
- Felix von Kraus (1870–1937), Austrian singer
- František R. Kraus (1903–1967), Czech writer
- Franz Kraus (1905–1998), Israeli graphic designer
- Georg Melchior Kraus (1737–1806), German painter
- Gertrud Kraus (1901–1977), Israeli modern dancer
- Hansi Kraus (born 1952), German actor
- Jan Kraus (actor) (born 1953), Czech actor and TV host
- Jessica Reed Kraus, American writer
- Joseph Martin Kraus (1756–1792), German-Swedish classical composer
- Józef Antoni Kraus (died 1721), German sculptor
- Karl Kraus (writer) (1874–1936), Austrian writer
- Lili Kraus (1903–1986), Hungarian pianist
- Marianne Kraus (1765–1838), German painter, drafter and writer
- Markéta Krausová (1895–1942), Czech actress and opera singer
- Michael Kraus (baritone) (born 1957), Austrian operatic baritone
- Nicola Kraus (born 1974), American novelist
- Oliver Kraus (born 1970), English musician
- Otakar Kraus (1909–1980), Czech-British baritone
- Pat Kraus a.k.a. Kraus, New Zealand musician
- Patricia Kraus (born 1964), Spanish singer
- Peter Kraus (born 1939), German singer
- Philip Kraus (born 1950), American operatic baritone and stage director
- Robert Kraus (1925–2001), American children's author, cartoonist and publisher
- Sharron Kraus, English singer, songwriter and musician
- Shmulik Kraus (born in 1935–2013), Israeli actor, singer and composer
- Sonya Kraus (born 1973), German television presenter
- Živa Kraus (born 1945), Croatian painter
- Will Kraus a.k.a. Kraus (born 1994/95), American musician
- Yael Kraus, Israeli singer-songwriter

== Sport ==
- Adam Kraus (born 1984), American footballer
- Alanna Kraus (born 1977), Canadian speed skater
- Albert Kraus (born 1980), Dutch welterweight kickboxer
- Brigitte Kraus (born 1956), German middle distance runner
- Dan Kraus (1923–2012), American basketball player
- Daniel Kraus (footballer) (born 1984), German footballer
- Derek Kraus (born 2001), American racing driver
- Engelbert Kraus (1934–2016), German footballer
- Hans-Georg Kraus (1949–2020), German footballer
- Jan Kraus (footballer) (born 1979), Czech footballer
- Jana Krausová (born 1954), Czech actress
- Jillian Kraus (born 1986), American water polo player
- Katja Kraus (born 1970), German footballer
- Kevin Kraus (born 1992), German footballer
- Lucie Krausová (born 1986), Czech figure skater
- Martin Kraus (footballer, born 1992), Czech footballer
- Martin Kraus (footballer, born 1993), Austrian footballer
- Melanie Kraus (born 1974), German long-distance runner
- Michael Kraus (swimmer) (born 1955), German swimmer
- Michael Kraus (field hockey) (born 1958), American field hockey player
- Michael Kraus (handballer) (born 1983), German handball player
- Michael Kraus (soccer) (born 1984), American soccer player
- Nadine Kraus (born 1988), German footballer
- Peter Kraus (athlete) (1932–2016), German sprinter
- Peter Kraus (field hockey) (1941–2024), German field hockey player
- Sinja Kraus (born 2002), Austrian tennis player
- Tadeusz Kraus (1932–2018), Czechoslovak-Polish footballer
- Tomáš Kraus (born 1974), Czech alpine skier and freestyle skier
- Viorel Kraus (born 1940), Romanian footballer
- Wolfgang Kraus (born 1953), German footballer

== Science ==
- Arnoldo Kraus (1951–2025), Mexican medical doctor and academic
- Barbara Kraus (born 1975), Austrian physicist
- Charles A. Kraus (1875–1967), American chemist
- Christian Jakob Kraus (1753–1807), German linguist
- Edward Henry Kraus (1875–1973), American mineralogist
- Ezra Jacob Kraus (1885–1960), American botanist and horticulturist
- Friedrich Kraus (1858–1936), Austrian medical doctor
- Gregor Kraus (1841–1915), German botanist
- John D. Kraus (1910–2004), American electrical engineer
- Karl Kraus (physicist) (1938–1988), German theoretical physicist
- Ludwig Kraus (1857–1886), Czech mathematician
- Nina Kraus, American neuroscientist
- Otto Kraus (1930–2017), German zoologist
- Paul Kraus (Arabist) (1904–1944), Arabist researcher
- Sarit Kraus (born 1960), Israeli computer scientist

== Other ==
- Adolf Kraus (1850–1928), American lawyer, politician and Jewish leader
- Bill Kraus (1947–1986), American homosexual rights and AIDS activist
- Bruce Kraus (born 1954), American politician and businessman
- Dick Kraus (1937–2019), American educator and politician
- Dita Kraus (1929–2025), Czech-Israeli teacher and writer
- Eileen Kraus (1938–2017), American banker
- Erwin Kraus (1894–1966), German Nazi paramilitary official
- Franz Xaver Kraus (1840–1901), German Catholic priest
- Hans Kraus (1905–1995), Austrian-American physician and rock climber
- Hans P. Kraus (1907–1988), German-American antiquarian book dealer
- Hans-Werner Kraus (1915–1990), German U-boat commander
- Henry Kraus (1906–1995), American historian
- Herbert Kraus (1884–1965), German legal scholar
- Jacob Kraus (1861–1951), Dutch politician
- Jody Kraus, American lawyer
- Joe Kraus, American businessman
- Katharina T. Kraus, American philosopher
- Michael Kraus (minister) (1908–2003), Canadian entrepreneur and minister
- Milton Kraus (1866–1942), American politician
- Ognjen Kraus (born 1945), Croatian physician and Jewish community leader
- Oskar Kraus (1872–1942), Czech philosopher
- Paul Kraus (born 1944), Holocaust survivor and author
- Peter S. Kraus, American businessman
- Richard E. Kraus (1925–1944), American soldier
- Ursula Kraus (1930–2021), German politician
- Will Kraus (born 1973), American politician

== Fictional characters ==
- Johann Kraus, in the Hellboy universe

== See also ==
- Krause
- Krauss
- Krauze
- Krausz
- Polly Craus, American fencer
