= Krauser =

Krauser or Krausser is a surname. Notable people with the surname include:

- Carl Krauser (born 1981), U.S. Virgin Islands basketball player
- Helmut Krausser (born 1964), German author, poet and playwright
- Peter B. Krauser (born 1947), Maryland judge
- Max Krauser (1908–?), Polish wrestler, European heavyweight champion 1933-35

== Characters ==
- Jack Krauser, a freelance mercenary in the Resident Evil video games
- Johannes Krauser II, a band leader in the Detroit Metal City manga series
- Wolfgang Krauser von Stroheim, an opponent in the Fatal Fury video games

== See also ==
- Krauser Domani, a three-wheeled vehicle developed by Michael Krauser
- Kraus, a German surname
- Krause, a German surname
- Krauss, a German surname
