= K1200 =

K1200 may refer to:

- BMW K1200GT, a sport-touring motorcycle manufactured by BMW
- BMW K1200R, a general-purpose supersport motorcycle manufactured by BMW
- BMW K1200RS, a sport-touring motorcycle manufactured by BMW
- K-1200 K-MAX, an American helicopter manufactured by Kaman Aircraft
