= Krauser Domani =

Motorized tricycle

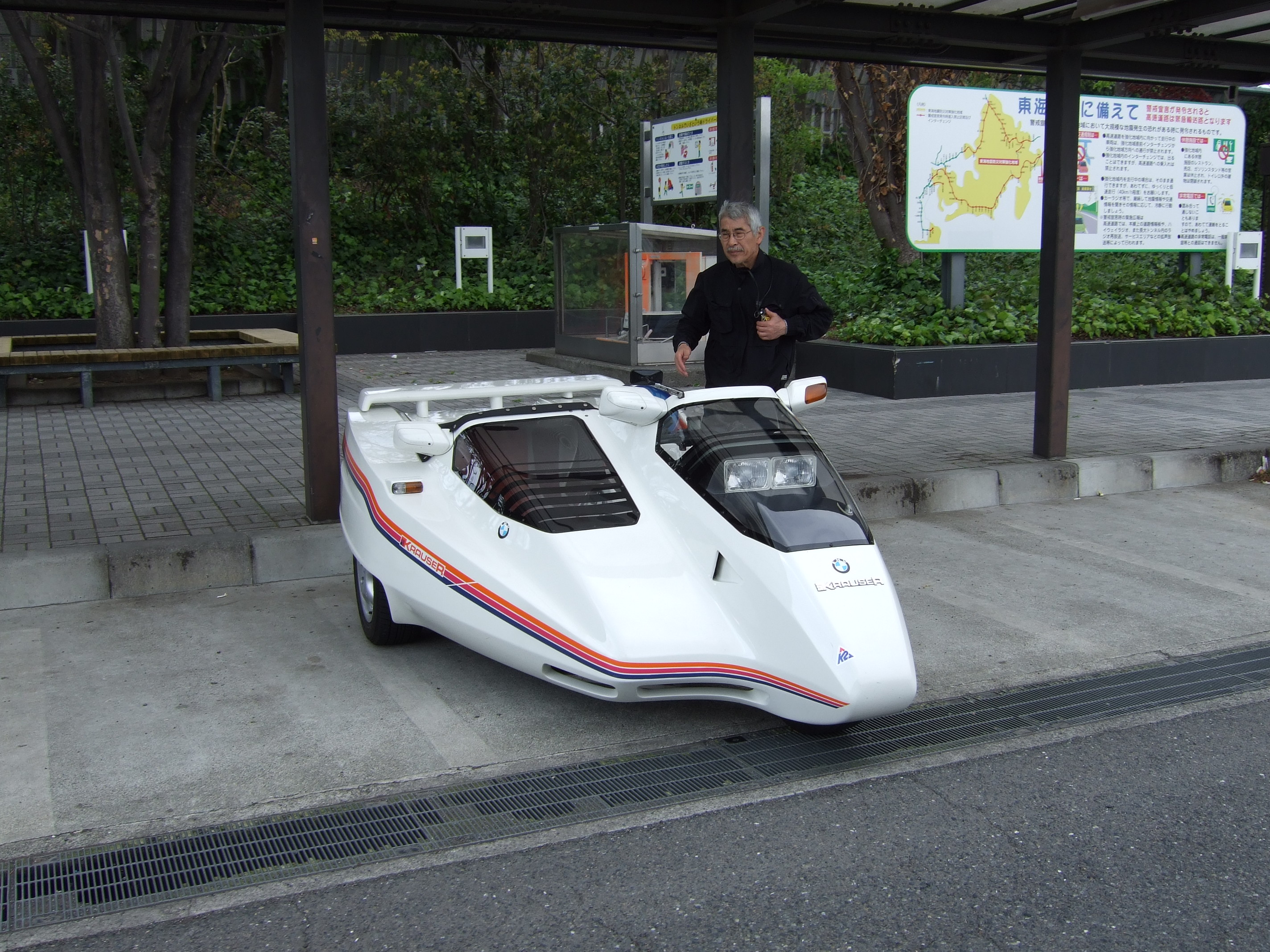
Krauser Domani

The Krauser Domani is a motorcycle based, three-wheeled vehicle developed by Michael Krauser and powered by BMW, built for sale in Japan and Europe. Somewhere between 100 and 150 examples were produced between 1988 and 2004. The vehicle looks like a motorcycle with a sidecar attached, however unlike the former, the "sidecar" of the Domani is structurally an integral part of the frame. In Japan, a motorcycle license is not required to drive it, a normal car license is sufficient. After Krauser's death in 1991 manufacture was taken over by LCR Engineering of Switzerland.

== Body & chassis ==
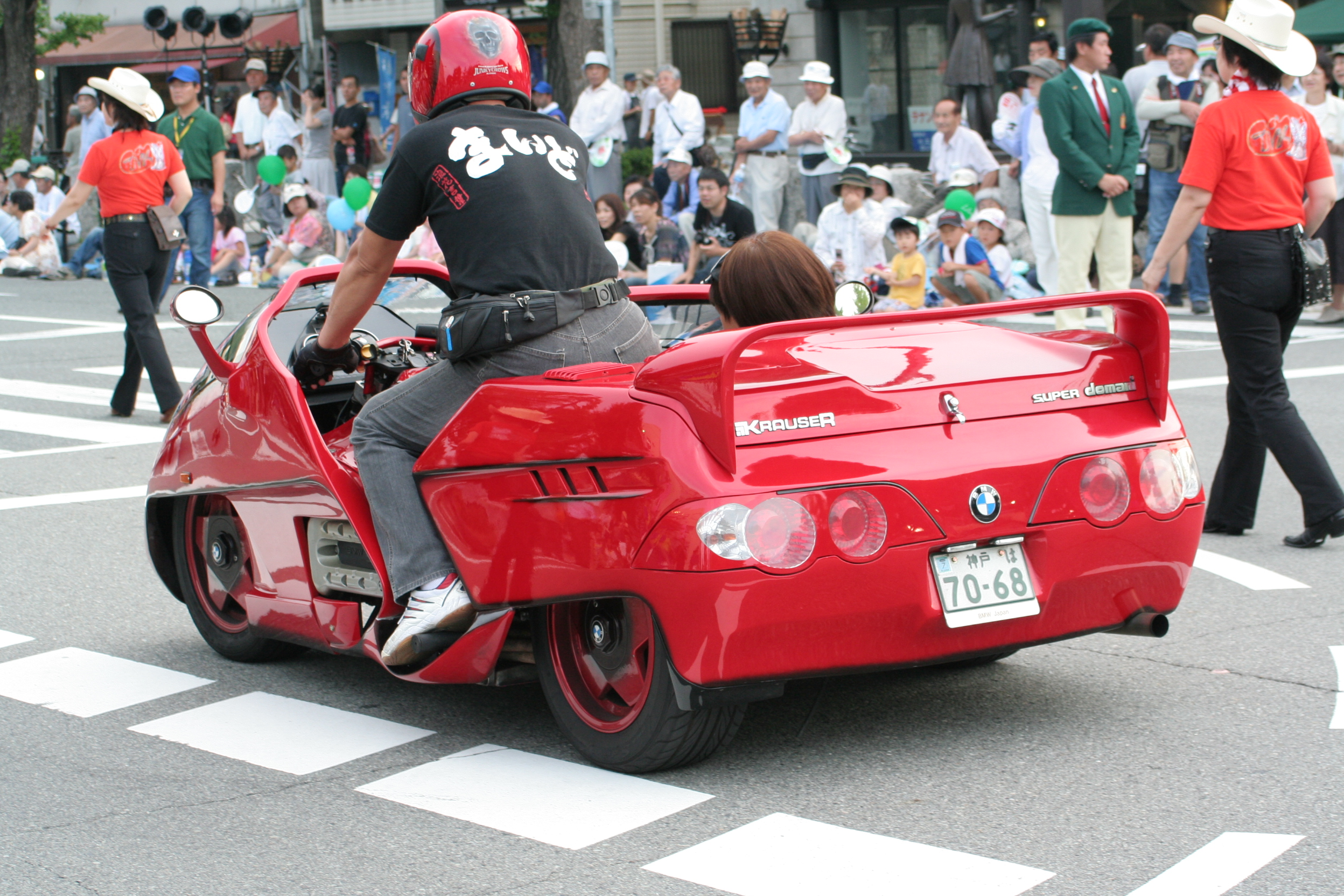
Rear view of a Domani

The Domani is built around a torsionally rigid tubular steel frame with structurally integrated sidecar unit. An advantage of this is that the frame is torsionally stiffer than that of a regular sidecar equipped motorcycle. Also, the suspension and layout for the two rear wheels can now be more car-like. The unique frame also allows for aerodynamic fibreglass bodywork that would not be possible in a traditional set-up. This in turn allows for some unique packaging of the components, for example the radiator is mounted in the sidecar where it is better exposed to airflow. The aerodynamic skin also allows for the inclusion of a small luggage compartment in the back.

== Engine ==
The Domani is powered by a BMW K 1200 engine producing 150 hp (112 kW) and connected to a five-speed gearbox. The engine, coupled with the Domani's light curb weight 390 kg (860 lb), is enough to power the vehicle to a factory specified maximum of over 200 km/h (124 mph).

== Suspension ==
The Domani utilizes three wheel independent suspension with double-wishbones at the rear and dual rocker arms at the front. These are connected to 185/60 R14 tyres at the front and in the sidecar and 195/60 R15 at the rear.

== In popular culture ==
The Domani is featured in Kōsuke Fujishima's manga Oh My Goddess! as the vehicle of choice for the character Chihiro Fujimi.

== See also ==
- BMW K1200GT
- BMW K1200R
- BMW K1200RS
- GG Duetto
- List of motorized trikes
