= Project 64 =

Project 64 may refer to:

- Project64, an open source Nintendo 64 emulator for Windows
- Project 64 (Mini Cooper), a New Zealand team seeking the land speed record for vehicles with an engine capacity of between 751cc and 1000cc
- See Design B-65 cruiser for Project 64, a planned Imperial Japanese Navy battlecruiser that was superseded by Project 65
