= List of Austrian football transfers winter 2018–19 =

This is a list of Austrian football transfers for the 2018–19 winter transfer window by club. Only transfers of clubs in the Austrian Football Bundesliga are included.

== Austrian Football Bundesliga ==
=== Admira Wacker ===
In:

No.	Pos.	Nation	Player
6	DF	AUT	Christoph Schösswendter (from (Germany) Union Berlin)
31	MF	GER	Kolja Pusch (on loan from (Germany) 1. FC Heidenheim)

Out:

No.	Pos.	Nation	Player
37	MF	AUT	Marco Sahanek (loan return to Floridsdorfer AC)
—	GK	AUT	Martin Kraus (to SC Neusiedl)

=== Austria Wien ===
In:

No.	Pos.	Nation	Player
37	FW	CTA	Sterling Yateke (from (Finland) Turun Palloseura)

Out:

No.	Pos.	Nation	Player
9	FW	AUT	Kevin Friesenbichler (on loan to Wolfsberger AC)
11	FW	BRA	Lucas Venuto (to (Canada) Vancouver Whitecaps)

=== LASK ===
In:

No.	Pos.	Nation	Player
9	FW	BRA	Klauss (on loan from (Germany) Hoffenheim II, previously on loan at (Finland) HJK)
23	MF	AUT	Stefan Haudum (from Blau-Weiß Linz)

Out:

No.	Pos.	Nation	Player
55	MF	GHA	Reuben Acquah (on loan to TSV Hartberg)

=== Rapid Wien ===
In:

No.	Pos.	Nation	Player
14	MF	BIH	Srđan Grahovac (from (Kazakhstan) Astana, previously on loan at (Croatia) Rijeka)

Out:

No.	Pos.	Nation	Player
25	MF	AUT	Aleksandar Kostić (to (Serbia) Radnički Niš)
32	GK	AUT	Christoph Haas (to SV Horn)
43	FW	SUI	Jérémy Guillemenot (to (Switzerland) FC St. Gallen)
—	MF	AUT	Albin Gashi (on loan to SV Horn, previously on loan at (Netherlands) Den Bosch)

=== Red Bull Salzburg ===
In:

No.	Pos.	Nation	Player
5	DF	AUT	Albert Vallci (from Wacker Innsbruck)
30	FW	NOR	Erling Haaland (from (Norway) Molde)

Out:

No.	Pos.	Nation	Player
4	MF	MLI	Amadou Haidara (to (Germany) RB Leipzig)
7	MF	GER	Reinhold Yabo (to (Germany) Arminia Bielefeld)
28	MF	AUT	Romano Schmid (to (Germany) Werder Bremen)
31	GK	BRA	Carlos Miguel Coronel (on loan at (United States) Philadelphia Union)
—	GK	BRA	Airton (to (Brazil) Pelotas, previously on loan at (Brazil) Red Bull Brasil)
—	MF	GER	Marc Rzatkowski (to (United States) New York Red Bulls, previously on loan)
—	FW	GER	Mërgim Berisha (on loan to SCR Altach, previously on loan at (Germany) 1. FC Magdeburg)
—	DF	FRA	Mahamadou Dembélé (on loan to (Netherlands) Fortuna Sittard, previously on loan at Liefering)

=== SCR Altach ===
In:

No.	Pos.	Nation	Player
33	GK	AUT	Reuf Duraković (free agent)
37	FW	GER	Mërgim Berisha (on loan from Red Bull Salzburg, previously on loan at (Germany) 1. FC Magdeburg)
—	DF	BRA	Anderson (on loan from (Brazil) Audax)

Out:

No.	Pos.	Nation	Player
28	MF	AUT	Boris Prokopič (to (Liechtenstein) Vaduz)
—	FW	TUR	Volkan Akyildiz (on loan to Wiener Neustadt, previously on loan at Austria Klagenfurt)

=== St. Pölten ===
In:

No.	Pos.	Nation	Player

Out:

No.	Pos.	Nation	Player
16	MF	AUT	Osarenren Okungbowa (to Floridsdorfer AC)
21	DF	AUT	Patrick Puchegger (on loan to Amstetten)
28	DF	AUT	Damir Mehmedovic (to Lafnitz)

=== Sturm Graz ===
In:

No.	Pos.	Nation	Player
17	DF	GHA	Gideon Mensah (on loan from Liefering)
29	FW	AUT	Arnel Jakupović (on loan from (Italy) Empoli)

Out:

No.	Pos.	Nation	Player
10	MF	AUT	Peter Žulj (to (Belgium) Anderlecht)
20	DF	POR	Filipe Ferreira (on loan to (Portugal) Nacional)
36	DF	ITA	Gabriele Piras (to Lafnitz)

=== SV Mattersburg ===
In:

No.	Pos.	Nation	Player

Out:

No.	Pos.	Nation	Player
7	FW	ESP	Jefté Betancor (on loan to Vorwärts Steyr)
29	DF	AUT	Daniel Kerschbaumer (to Vorwärts Steyr)

=== TSV Hartberg ===
In:

No.	Pos.	Nation	Player
—	MF	MLI	Mohamed Camara (on loan from Liefering)
—	MF	GHA	Reuben Acquah (on loan from LASK)
—	MF	AUT	Peter Tschernegg (from (Switzerland) St. Gallen)
—	FW	MNE	Meris Skenderović (on loan from (Germany) Hoffenheim II)

Out:

No.	Pos.	Nation	Player
6	MF	AUT	Ivan Ljubic (loan return to Sturm Graz)
26	MF	MLI	Youba Diarra (loan return to Red Bull Salzburg)

=== Wacker Innsbruck ===
In:

No.	Pos.	Nation	Player
27	DF	AUT	Christian Klem (from Lafnitz)
50	DF	AUT	Manuel Maranda (from Wacker Innsbruck II)

Out:

No.	Pos.	Nation	Player
7	FW	SVN	Patrik Eler (loan return to (France) Nancy)
20	DF	AUT	Dominik Baumgartner (to (Germany) VfL Bochum)
27	DF	AUT	Albert Vallci (to Red Bull Salzburg)

=== Wolfsberger AC ===
In:

No.	Pos.	Nation	Player
—	FW	MLI	Sékou Koïta (on loan from Liefering)
—	FW	AUT	Kevin Friesenbichler (on loan from Austria Wien)

Out:

No.	Pos.	Nation	Player
12	FW	JAM	Dever Orgill (to (Turkey) Ankaragücü)
