= Ernst Krause =

Ernst Krause may refer to:

- Ernst Krause (biologist) (1839–1903), German biologist
- Ernst Krause (entomologist) (1899–1987), German entomologist
- Ernst Krause (musicologist) (1911–1997), German musicologist
- Ernst Henry Krause (1913–1989), American physicist

== See also ==
- Ernst Kraus (1863–1941), German tenor
