= Reuf =

Reuf may refer to:

- Reuf Bajrović, politician
- Reuf Duraković, footballer
- Reuf Pasha, dispatched from Constantinople to Slivna as the temporary head of the defense of the Balkans
- Reuf (song)
