= BMW K1300R =

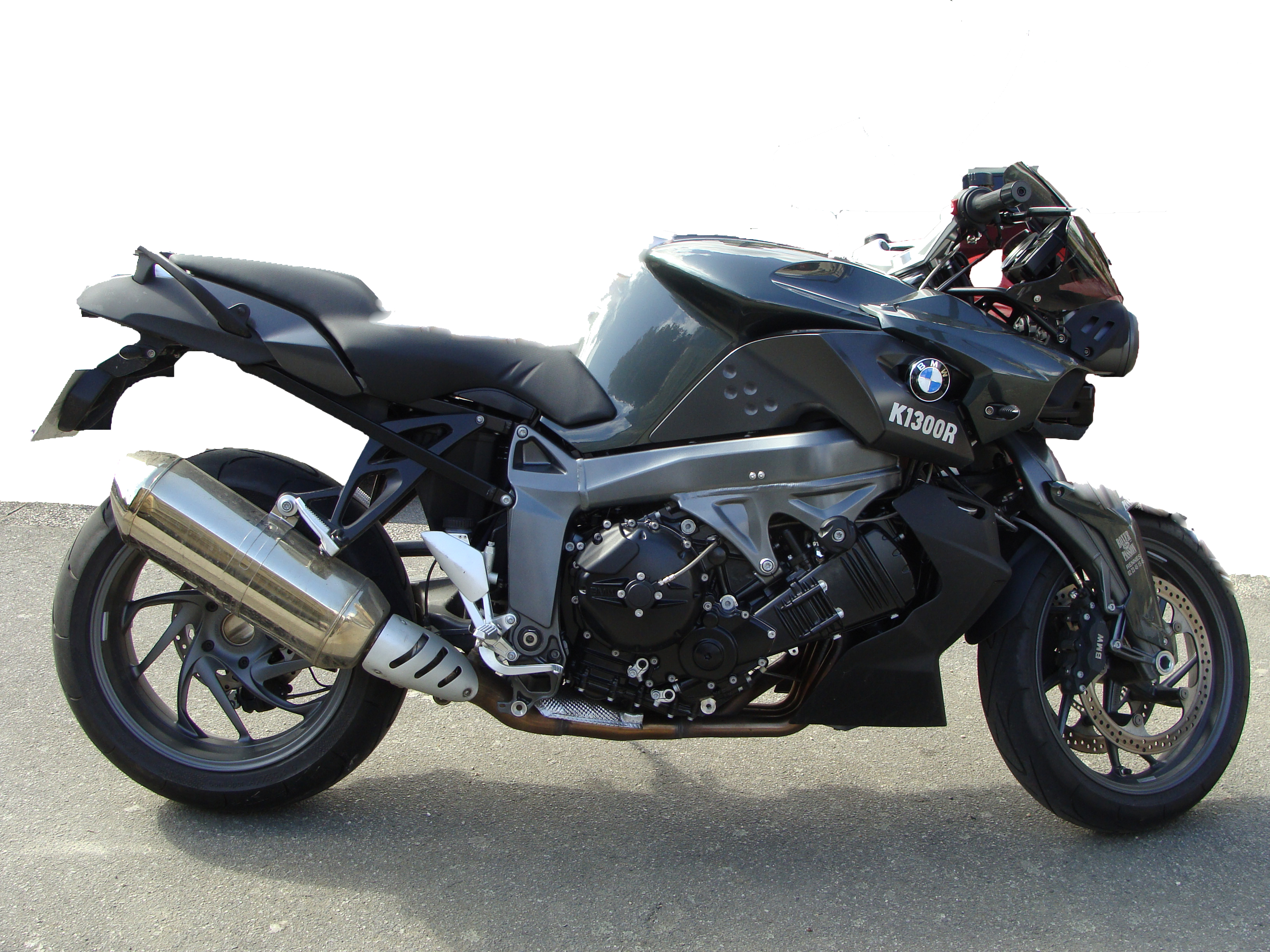
- Manufacturer: BMW Motorrad
- Production: 2009–2015
- Predecessor: K1200R
- Class: Naked
- Engine: 1,293 cc (78.9 cu in) inline-4, EFI, anti-knock sensor
- Bore / stroke: 80.0 mm × 64.3 mm (3.15 in × 2.53 in)
- Compression ratio: 13.0:1
- Power: 173 hp (129 kW) @ 9,250 rpm (claimed)
- Torque: 140 N⋅m (100 lbf⋅ft) @ 8,250 rpm (claimed)
- Transmission: Constant mesh 6-speed gearbox, shaft drive
- Suspension: Front: Duolever fork Rear: monoshock ESA electronically adjustable
- Brakes: front: 320 mm dual disc, rear: 265 mm single disc optional ABS)
- Tires: front: 120/70 ZR 17, rear: 180/55 ZR 17
- Wheelbase: 1,585 mm (62.4 in)
- Dimensions: L: 2,228 mm (87.7 in); W: 856 mm (33.7 in) (incl. mirrors); H: 1,095 mm (43.1 in) (excl. mirrors)
- Seat height: standard 820 mm (32 in) low 790 mm (31 in)
- Weight: 217 kg (478 lb) (claimed) (dry); 243 kg (536 lb) (claimed) (wet)
- Fuel capacity: 19 L (4.2 imp gal; 5.0 US gal)
- Related: K1300GT, K1300S

The BMW K1300R is a naked motorcycle made by BMW from 2008 to 2015. When launched, it replaced the K1200R as BMW's flagship urban motorcycle. BMW says the K1300R produces 173 hp (129 kW) at 9,250 rpm and 140 N⋅m (103 lb⋅ft) of torque at 8,250 rpm from its 1,293 cc (78.9 cu in) inline-four engine. The engine was subtly modified by British company Ricardo plc. It has an exhaust butterfly flap to boost torque and improve exhaust note. The K1300R features BMW's optional ESA-II electronic suspension adjustment. The bike also has a conventional indicator switch instead of the usual BMW three button configuration.

The K1300R is considered a muscle bike, a slang term for naked or standard motorcycles that put an emphasis on high power output and quick acceleration. Its close gearing and exceptionally broad power delivery provide the drive output power necessary to accelerate quickly, while its long wheelbase and low and canted mounted engine help the motorcycle plant the power without unintentional power wheelies. In tests carried out by Bike Magazine in the UK, its 2.81 second 0–100 km/h (0–62 mph) time made it the fastest accelerating naked motorcycle, beating its next closest competitor, the Suzuki B-King, by one tenth of a second.

Throughout its production run, K1300R has never been offered for sale in the United States despite being offered in the smaller Canadian market.

== In popular culture ==
On 20 December 2013, Bollywood film Dhoom 3 featured a modified BMW K1300R ridden by Aamir Khan.

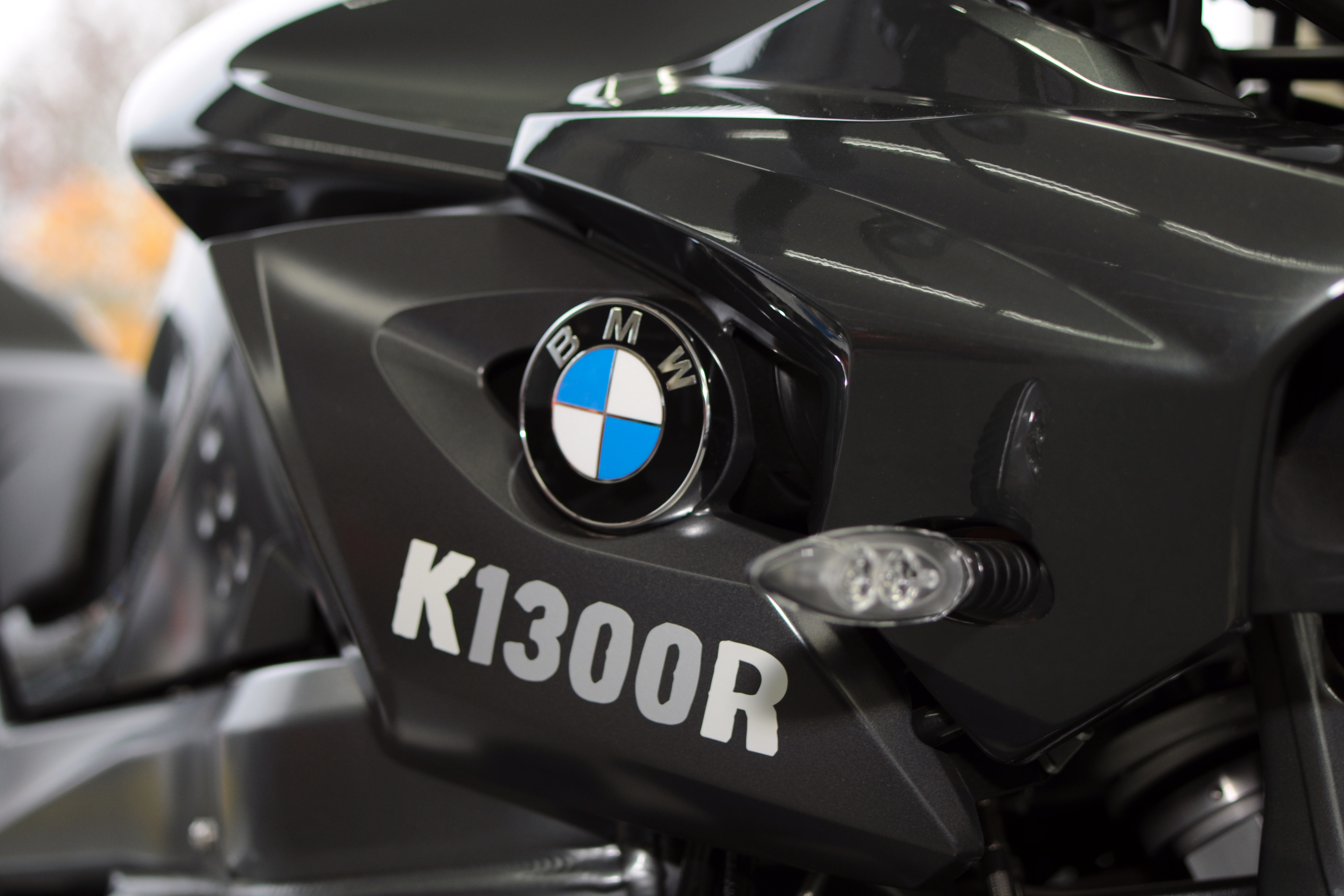
K1300R tank badge
