= Joseph Kraus =

Joseph Kraus may refer to:

- Joseph Anton Kraus (died 1721), German sculptor
- Joseph Martin Kraus (1756–1792), composer
