= Martin Kraus =

Martin Kraus may refer to:

- Martin Kraus (footballer, born 1992), Czech footballer for Vlašim
- Martin Kraus (footballer, born 1993), Austrian footballer for Wiener Sport-Club

== See also ==
- Joseph Martin Kraus (1756-1792), German-born Swedish composer
- Martin Krause (1853–1918), German concert pianist
- Martin Krause (mathematician) (1851–1920), German mathematician
