= Accessory lacrimal glands =

Exocrine glands which secrete tears

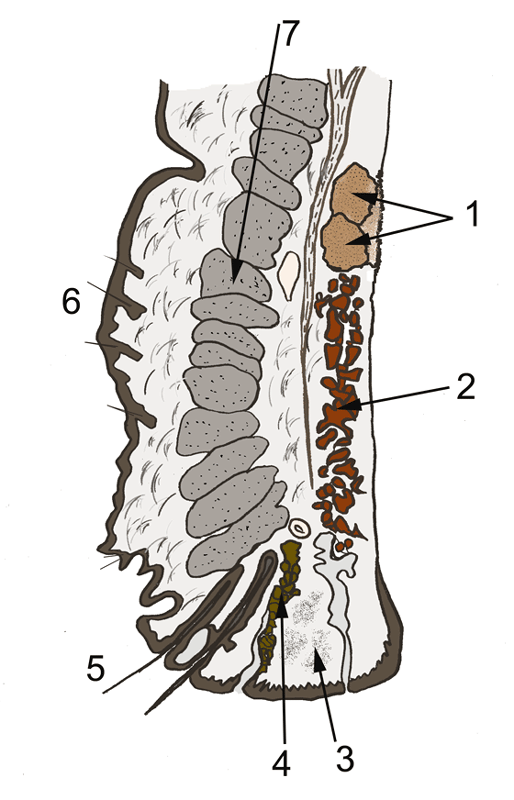
- Accessory-lacrimal-glands

Details
- System: Lacrimal system

Krause's glands and Wolfring's glands (or Ciaccio's glands) are the accessory lacrimal glands of the lacrimal system of human eye. These glands are structurally and histologically similar to the main lacrimal gland. Glands of Krause are located in the stroma of the conjunctival fornix, and the glands of Wolfring are located along the orbital border of the tarsal plate. These glands are oval and display numerous acini. The acini are surrounded, sometimes incompletely, by a row of myoepithelial cells. Animal studies suggest that the ducts of Wolfring glands have a tortuous course and open onto the palpebral conjunctiva. Like the main lacrimal gland, the accessory lacrimal glands are also densely innervated, but they lack parasympathetic innervation. These glands are exocrine glands, responsible for the basal (unstimulated) secretion of the middle aqueous layer of the tear film. 20 to 40 glands of Krause are found in the upper fornix, and 6-8 glands appear in the lower fornix. There are usually 2 to 5 Ciaccio's glands, and are found along the superior tarsal border of the upper eyelid. Popov’s glands are located within the substance of the caruncle.

== Function ==
Previously it was thought that the main lacrimal gland is responsible for reflex tear secretion and the accessory lacrimal glands of Wolfring and Krause are responsible for the basal secretion. But recent evidence suggests that all tearing may be reflex. The accessory glands account for approximately 10% of the total lacrimal secretory mass.

== History ==
Ciaccio's glands are named after Italian anatomist Giuseppe Vincenzo Ciaccio (1824–1901), who described these glands in 1874. They are sometimes called "Wolfring's glands" after Polish ophthalmologist Emilj von Wolfring (1832-1906), who described them during the same time period as did Ciaccio. Krause's glands are named after German anatomist Karl Friedrich Theodor Krause (1797–1868).

== See also ==
- Lacrimal apparatus
- Lacrimal gland
