= Ciaccio's glands =

Tear glands of the eye

Ciaccio's glands or Wolfring's glands are small tubular accessory lacrimal glands (glandulae lacrimales accessoriae) found in the lacrimal caruncle of the eyelid. These accessory lacrimal glands are located in the upper border of the tarsus, approximately in the middle between the extremities of the tarsal glands. Sometimes they are situated slightly above the tarsus. There are usually 2 to 5 of these glands in the upper eyelid, and their function is to produce tears which are secreted onto the surface of the conjunctiva.

They are named after Italian anatomist Giuseppe Vincenzo Ciaccio (1824–1901), who described these glands in 1874. They are sometimes called "Wolfring's glands" after Polish ophthalmologist Emilj von Wolfring (1832-1906), who described them during the same time period as did Ciaccio.

Another type of accessory lacrimal gland are "Krause's glands", which are smaller, more numerous than "Ciaccio's glands" and are found along the superior and inferior fornices of the conjunctival sac.
