= Charles Kraus =

Charles Kraus may refer to:

- Charles A. Kraus (1875–1967), American chemist
- Charles Kraus (clown) (born 1946), American clown, magician, writer, and comedian

== See also ==
- Charles Krause (disambiguation)
