= Paul Kraus (disambiguation) =

Paul Kraus (born 1944) is a Holocaust survivor and mesothelioma patient.

Paul Kraus may also refer to:

- Paul Kraus (Arabist) (1904–1944), Jewish Arabist
- Paul Krauß (1917–1942), German ski jumper
- Paul Krause (born 1942), American football safety

== See also ==
- Paul von Krause (1852–1923), German jurist and politician
