= Lacrimal caruncle =

Part of the eye

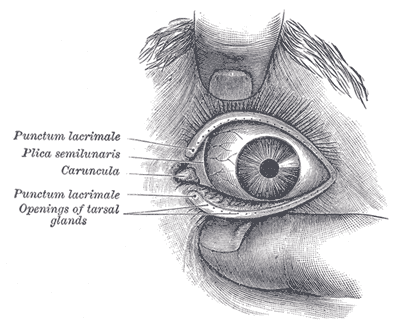
- Front of left eye with eyelids separated. Caruncula visible and labeled at left.

Details
- System: Eye

Identifiers
- Latin: caruncula lacrimalis
- TA98: A15.2.07.049
- TA2: 6844
- FMA: 77672

The lacrimal caruncle, or caruncula lacrimalis, is the small, pink, globular nodule at the inner corner (the medial canthus) of the eye. It consists of tissue types of neighbouring eye structures. It may suffer from lesions and allergic inflammation.

== Structure ==
The lacrimal caruncle is found at the medial canthus of the eye. It consists of skin, hair follicles, sebaceous glands, sweat glands, accessory lacrimal tissue and other tissues that are present in the skin and accessory lacrimal glands. Its non-keratinized epithelium resembles the conjunctival epithelium.

== Clinical significance ==
=== Lesions ===
The lacrimal caruncle may have a lesion. This can have any one of a number of causes, which may be difficult to diagnose. Cancer is a rare cause. These lesions include papillomas and oncocytomas.

=== Allergies ===
With ocular allergies, the lacrimal caruncle and the plica semilunaris of the conjunctiva may be inflamed and pruritic (itchy) due to histamine release in the tissue and tear film.

=== Other diagnoses ===
Sweat glands and oil glands are contained in the caruncle of the eye (lacrimal caruncle in medial canthus). As with all oil glands, lacrimal caruncles can become clogged, causing a pimple, whitehead, or pustule beneath the skin. Clogged oil and sweat glands in the caruncle can affect tear ducts. Treatment for dry eyes due to clogged glands includes refraining from rubbing the eyes and rinsing the eyes with clear water frequently during the day, either with clean hands or a spray faucet. Additionally, one can use a warm damp cloth on the eye, which will help the clogged pore to open up and release some pressure. Anti-bacterial eye drops may also be prescribed. If the pustules enlarge, an oral antibiotic may be prescribed. If lesions such as cysts form, they must be surgically drained; this operation is rarely necessary. If it affects the tear sac it may be dacryocystitis.

== Additional images ==
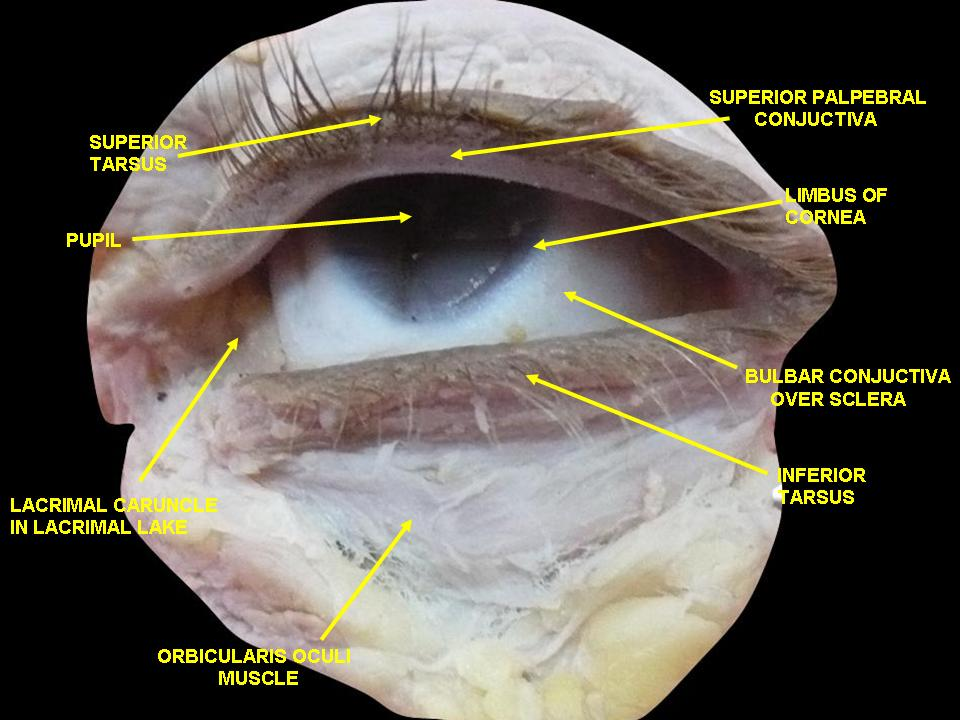
Extrinsic eye muscle. Nerves of orbita. Deep dissection

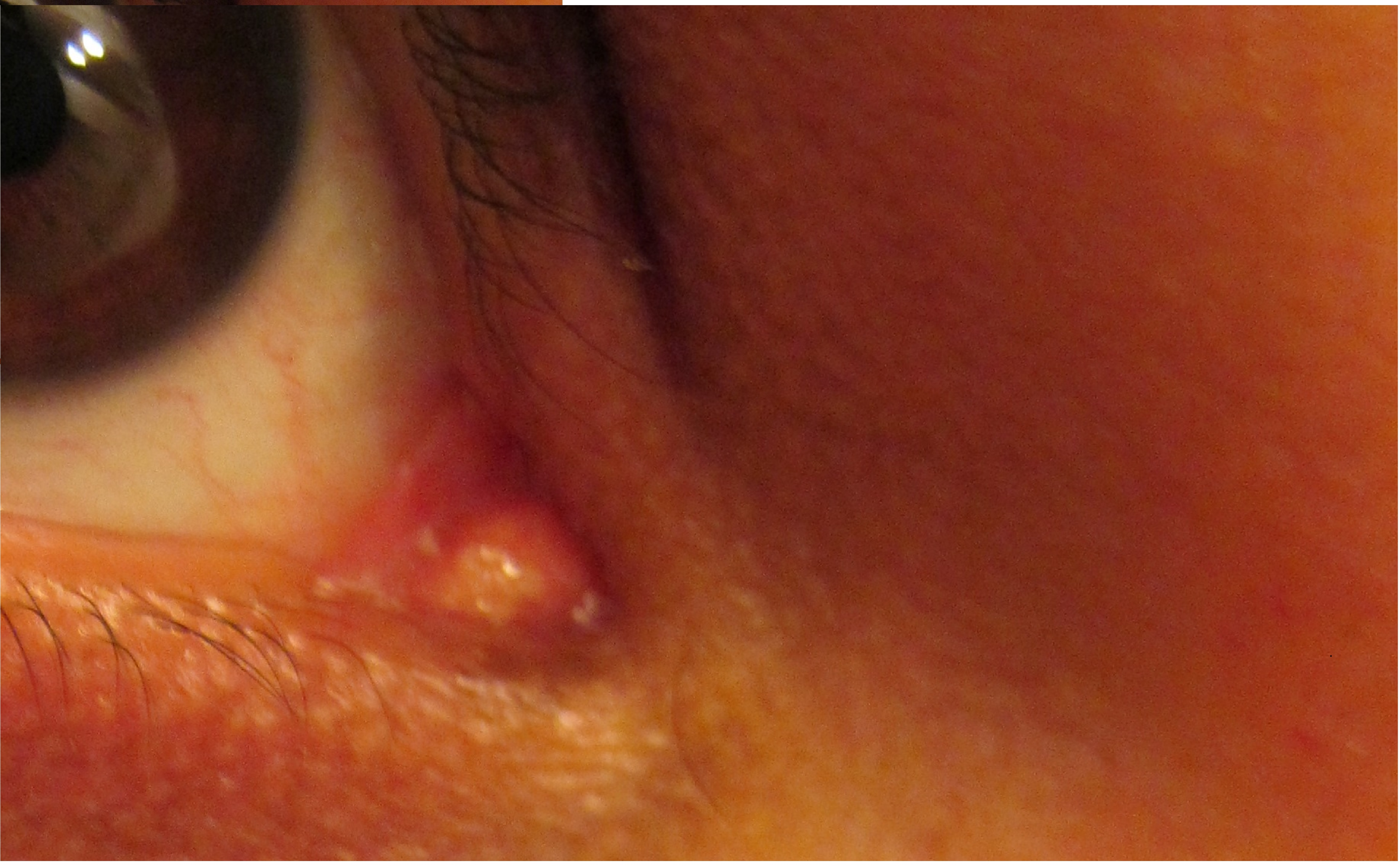
Small white lesion on lacrimal caruncle, most likely a cyst
