= Krauze =

Krauze is the Polish form of the German surname Krause. Notable people with the surname include:

- Zygmunt Krauze (born 1938), Polish composer
- Andrzej Krauze (born 1947), Polish-born British cartoonist and illustrator
- Enrique Krauze (born 1947), Mexican historian, essayist and publisher
- Krzysztof Krauze (1953–2014), Polish film director, cinematographer and actor
- León Krauze (born 1975), Mexican journalist

== See also ==
- Kraus
- Krause
- Krauss
- Krausz
