= BMW K1200RS =

Motorcycle

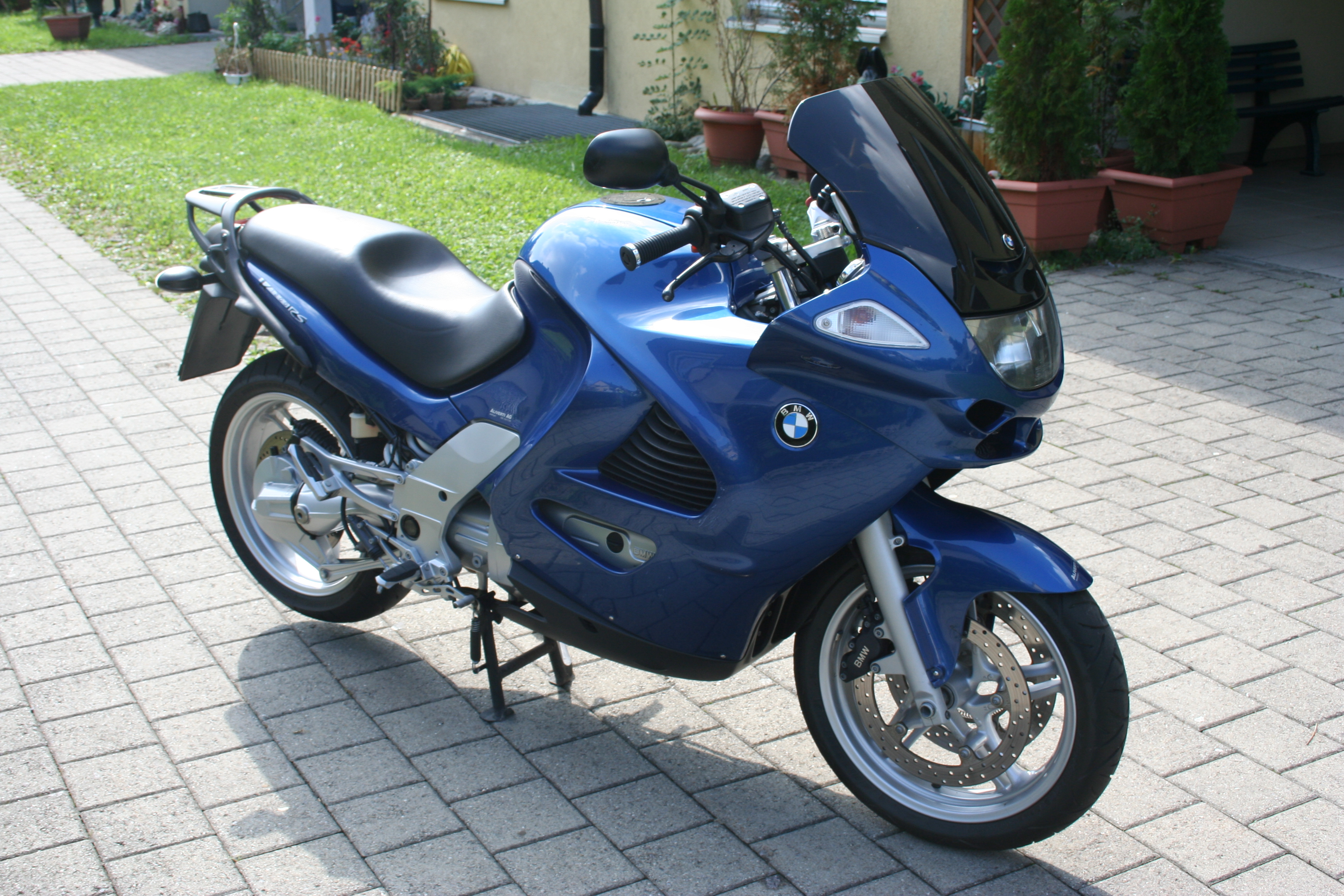
- Manufacturer: BMW Motorrad
- Production: 1997–2005
- Assembly: Germany
- Predecessor: K1100RS
- Class: Sport touring
- Engine: 1,171 cc (71.5 cu in) liquid-cooled longitudinally/horizontally mounted inline 4-cylinder DOHC
- Bore / stroke: 70.5 mm × 75 mm (2.78 in × 2.95 in)
- Compression ratio: 11.5:1
- Power: 130 hp (97 kW) @ 8,750 rpm
- Torque: 117 N⋅m (86 lbf⋅ft) @ 6,750 rpm
- Transmission: 6-speed, enclosed driveshaft
- Frame type: Die cast aluminum
- Brakes: Front and rear disc
- Wheelbase: 1,550 mm (61 in)
- Dimensions: L: 2,250 mm (89 in); W: 850 mm (33 in) with panniers H: 1,200 mm (47 in)
- Seat height: 770–800 mm (30–31 in)
- Weight: 266 kg (586 lb) (dry); 285 kg (628 lb) (wet)
- Fuel capacity: 20.5 L (4.5 imp gal; 5.4 US gal)
- Fuel consumption: 4.9 L/100 km; 58 mpg_{‑imp} (48 mpg_{‑US})
- Related: K1200R, K1200S

The BMW K1200RS is a sport-touring motorcycle made by BMW. The K1200RS is the last evolution of the BMW four-cylinder longitudinal engine, often referred to as the flying brick. From 1996 to 2004 37,992 units were built at the BMW plant in Spandau Germany.

== Model development ==
Until 2000, the factory code was K589. For model year 2001, the K1200RS was revised with a new model code, K547; that year, the front headlight panel was modified, foot peg position was lowered, handlebars raised slightly, and previously optional ABS was made standard.

In 2003, a 'GT' version of the K1200RS was introduced, featuring a slightly more upright seating position, adjustable footpegs, an electrically adjustable and somewhat larger windscreen and handguards - as well as colour-coded hard panniers as standard. The K1200GT was produced until 2005, after which it was replaced with a completely revised version with a transversely-mounted inline-four engine for 2006.
