= Krausz =

Krausz is a Hungarian surname of German and Jewish origin. Notable people with the name include:

- Adrienne Krausz (born 1967), Hungarian pianist
- Andor Kraszna-Krausz (1904–1989), Hungarian-British writer
- Ernest Krausz (1931–2018), Israeli professor
- Ferenc Krausz (born 1962), Hungarian-born Austrian physicist
- Gergely Krausz (born 1993), Hungarian badminton player
- Ilona Vincze-Krausz (1902–1998), Hungarian-Israeli teacher
- Michael Krausz (1942–2025), Swiss-born American philosopher
- Nikolett Krausz (born 1981), Hungarian artistic gymnast
- Peter Krausz (born 1946), Romanian-born Canadian artist
- Robert Krausz (1936–2002), Israeli trader

== See also ==
- Kraus
- Krause
- Krauss
- Krauze
