= Charles Krause =

Charles Krause may refer to:

- Charles I. Krause (1911–2002), American labor union organizer and local executive
- Charles Krause (gymnast) (fl. 1904), American gymnast

== See also ==
- Charles Kraus (disambiguation)
