= Project 64 (Mini Cooper) =

Project '64 Mini Cooper S
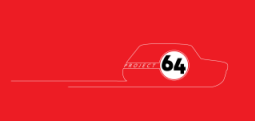

Overview
- Manufacturer: British Motor Corporation

Body and chassis
- Class: Land Speed Record vehicle
- Body style: Mini Cooper S

Powertrain
- Engine: Turbocharged 970 A-series Cooper S
- Transmission: 4 speed manual

Dimensions
- Wheelbase: 2,036 mm (80.2 in)
- Length: 3,054 mm (120.2 in)
- Width: 1,397 mm (55.0 in)
- Height: 1,346 mm (53.0 in)

Project '64 is the name of the attempt to break the car land speed record for vehicles with an engine capacity of between 751 cc and 1000 cc (I/BGCC class) in a 1964 Mk1 Mini Cooper 970 S. The Project '64 team was successful in 2012, setting a record of 146.595 mph (235.922 km/h) at the SCTA Speed Week at Bonneville Salt Flats. The Project '64 team had planned to attempt to raise the record in 2014 and 2015. In 2014 their car was not complete in time to ship to Bonneville due to delays manufacturing specialist engine components and in 2015 Speed Week was cancelled due to poor track conditions. They now intend to compete at Speed Week 2016.

== Project 64 team ==
The core Project '64 team members for the 2012 record attempt were Garry Orton, Guy Griffith, Garry Grant, Bryan Hartley, Nelson Hartley, Larry Mulholland, Chris Jones and Mike Wilson. The Project '64 team was founded in Nelson, New Zealand, and team members are based in Nelson, Christchurch and Palmerston North. The project is privately funded through fundraising and sponsorship.

Burt Munro's grandson, Rob Henderson, unveiled the Project '64 Mini at a fundraising event on September 10, 2011. Munro, also from New Zealand, broke the land speed record with a 47-year-old Scout Indian motorcycle in 1967. His story was the basis of the film The World's Fastest Indian.

== Project 64 car ==
The Project 64 car is a modified 1964 Morris Mini Cooper 970 S, manufactured in 1964. Only 963 of the 970 cc Cooper S models were built, all in the UK, although more than 5 million Minis of all types were built between 1959 and 2000. Although the Mini was not originally conceived as a racing car, its potential was quickly foreseen by motorsport designers including John Cooper, who developed the Cooper version. The 970 cc Mini Cooper was created to compete in sub-1000 cc categories. The compact car has a wheel base and track that are not suited to straight line speed; the car's success in motor sport is credited to braking, acceleration, and cornering ability.

=== Modifications ===
The Project '64 car was built from a rusty Cooper S, with repaired parts of the body shell coming from a similarly aged Morris 850. A roll cage to conform to SCTA requirements for record runs was added. The short-stroke 970 A-series Cooper S motor was bored to 998 cc and modified with a BMW K1200R motorcycle twin cam 4 valve per cylinder head, fuel injection, and an IHI turbocharger and intercooler. The modified engine delivers approximately 286 bhp (213 kW) on pump fuel and 328 bhp (245 kW) on methanol. The aerodynamics of the chassis were optimised and 12 inch Yokohama tyres rated for speeds up to 150 mph (240 km/h) were fitted. The body is stock apart from a front spoiler, smooth undertray, modified grille and ducting for the air intake.

== Records ==
The previous world land speed record in the Project 64 class was 131 mph (211 km/h). The two key records Project '64 aimed to break were:

- Bonneville Speedweek I/BGCC class – 131 mph (211 km/h)
- Unofficial world's fastest Classic Mini – 121 mph (195 km/h)

=== 2012 record ===
On 16 August 2012, Project '64 broke the world land speed record for a forced induction competition coupe petrol car of 751cc to 1000cc in Record class I/BGCC. The record is calculated on two runs: a qualifying run (faster than the existing record) and a record run (fast enough to provide an average greater than the existing record). The qualifying run was timed at 142.103 mph (228.693 km/h), and the record run was even faster at 151.087 mph (243.151 km/h), giving an average of 146.595 mph (235.922 km/h). The record was listed under Classic Cars Ltd (the name under which the car was entered). On its last run, the Project '64 car achieved an officially recorded speed of 156.045 mph (251.130 km/h). Technical issues and lack of time prevented the team from converting this into a record.

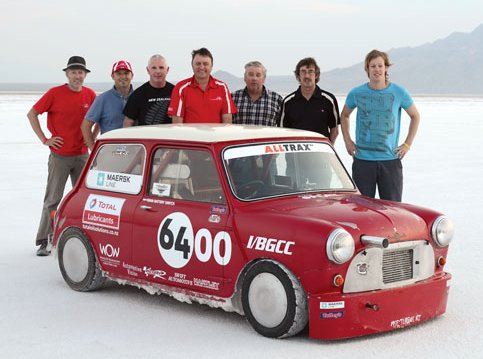
Project '64 at Bonneville flats, along with some support crew.

=== 2014 record attempt ===
Although Project '64 planned to return to Bonneville Salt Flats in August 2014 to attempt to raise the record above 150 mph, the plans were cancelled due to logistical difficulties and costs.

=== 2015 record attempt ===
In 2015 Project '64 again planned to return to Bonneville Salt Flats for Speed Week. The car was shipped to Los Angeles but Speed Week was cancelled due to poor track conditions. The car remained in the USA in storage in Lancaster, California.

=== 2016 record attempt ===
The Project '64 team returned to Bonneville Salt Flats for Speed Week 2016, August 13-19.

== See also ==
- Land speed record
- List of vehicle speed records
- Speed Week
- Bert Munro
