= Project64 =

Nintendo 64 emulation software

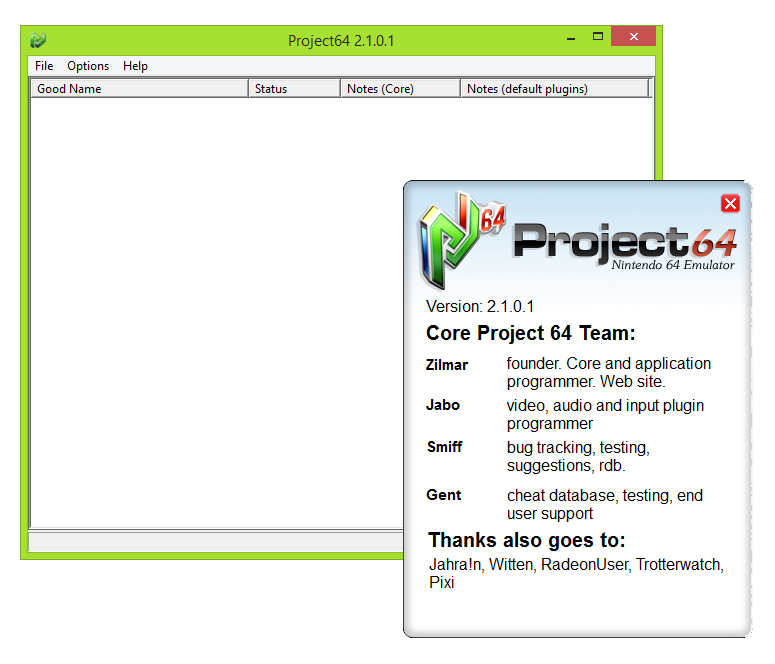
- Project64 2.1.0.1 running on Windows 8.1
- Developers: Zilmar; Shygoo; Azimer
- Initial release: May 26, 2001; 24 years ago
- Stable release: 3.0.1 / July 30, 2021; 4 years ago
- Repository: github.com/project64/project64
- Written in: C, C++
- Operating system: Windows, Android
- Available in: Multi-language
- Type: Video game console emulator
- License: GPL-2.0-only
- Website: www.pj64-emu.com

Project64 is a free and open-source Nintendo 64 emulator written in the programming languages C and C++ for Microsoft Windows. This software uses a plug-in system allowing third-party groups to use their own plug-ins to implement specific components. Project64 can play Nintendo 64 games on a computer reading ROM images, either dumped from the read-only memory of a Nintendo 64 ROM cartridge or created directly on the computer as homebrew.

Project64 was considered one of the top performing emulators and the most popular Nintendo 64 emulator in 2013. The program is licensed under the GNU General Public License version 2.

== Compatibility and features ==
Project64 is considered a highly compatible emulator which does not require the use of a Basic Input/Output System (BIOS). The emulator has basic features, supports multiplayer, and allows alternating the aspect ratio without cropping or quality drop.

== Development history ==
Development of Project64 began in March 1998 with a small team consisting of Zilmar and others. In September 1999, Zilmar was introduced to Jabo, who was developing an N64 Emulator of his own. In December 1999, Jabo was invited to join Zilmar on a collaborative effort for Project64. Jabo initially did not intend on being the RDP/Graphics developer, having a greater interest in assembly language and the central processing unit (CPU) but found himself often working on the graphics aspects.

The authors have released certain parts of the source code for the now unsupported version 1.4. Project64k is a modified version of Project64 1.4 which provides multiplayer netplay abilities via integrating the Kaillera networking client. Players are able to join servers where multiple games may be hosted with other features remaining consistent with Project64 1.4. In July 2011, Jabo decided to stop developing Project64 and released a modified version of 1.6 with some improvements. He also stated that no more releases of the source code were going to happen. However, in April 2013, Zilmar released both Project64 2.0 and an official repository of its source code that was made available on the Project64 website making the software fully open-source and accessible to everyone. It was mentioned that a major part of the code was rewritten in this version. Then about a month later, Project64 2.1 was released. In April 2015, Project64 2.2 was released along with its source code in a GitHub repository. From May 2015 onwards Project64 2.2 was able to play 64DD disk roms. On August 1, 2016, Project64 version 2.3 was released, eventually being updated to version 2.3.2 in January 2017. On May 27, 2021, Project64 version 3.0.0 was released to celebrate its 20th anniversary.

== Reception ==
In 2011, PC World praised the emulator for offering more "advanced settings" than Nintendo's official Nintendo 64 emulation available through the Virtual Console, such as the ability to change the game's aspect ratio, but criticized the emulation for being imperfect, describing it as "rough around the edges".

However, up to version 2.2, there were major safety concerns of installing Project64 through its official installer after numerous reports on social media websites of the installers containing malware. In July 2016, this malware code was removed from both the source code and its installers. A nagware screen began to occur after the release of Project64 2.3. The nagware screen grew more persistent with successive launches as a forced waiting period is installed. The emulation community has since created a workaround to prevent this issue.

== See also ==
- List of video game emulators
- Mupen64Plus, an alternative Nintendo 64 emulator
