= Ursula Kraus =

German politician (1930–2021)

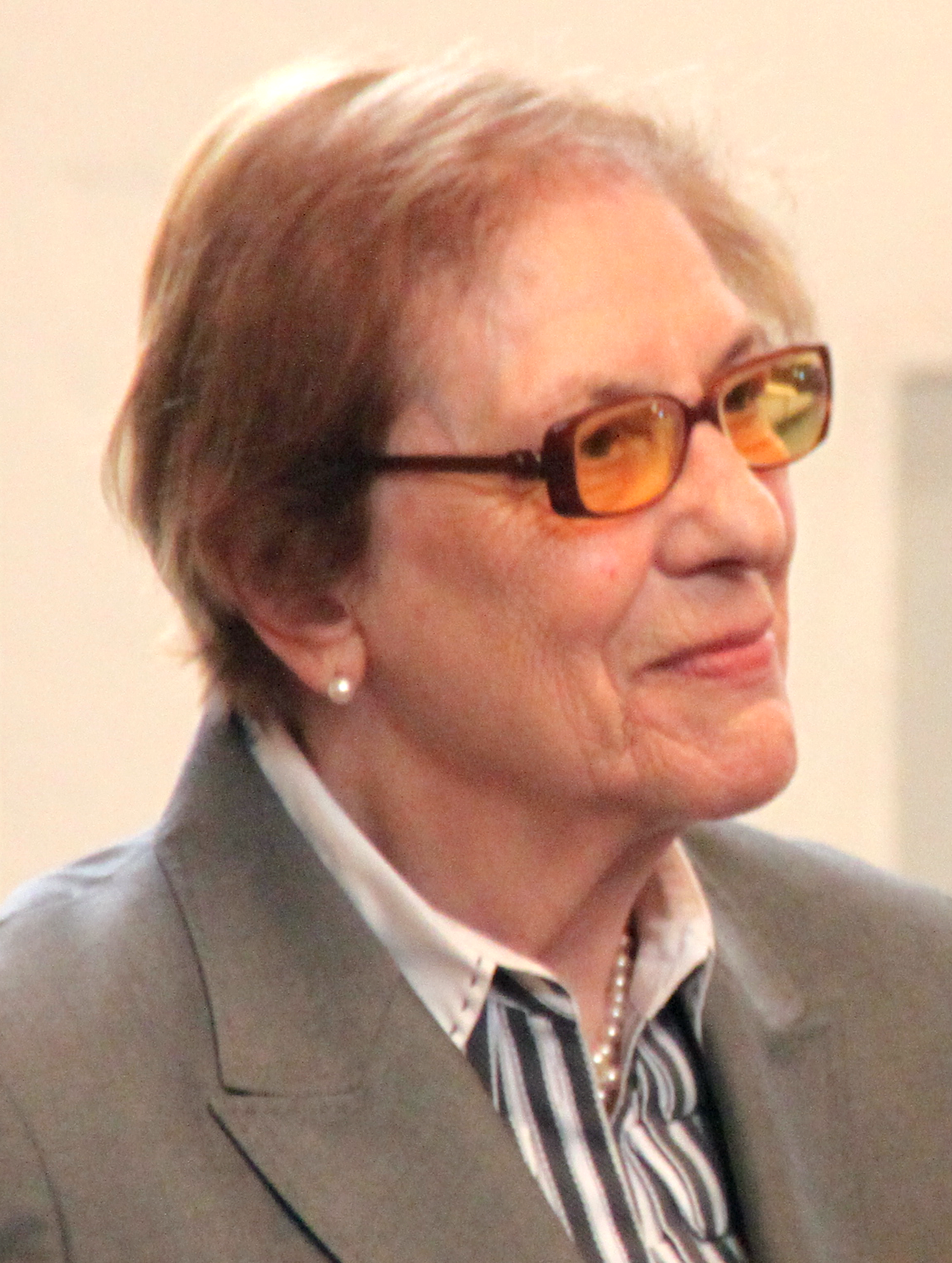

Mayor of Wuppertal
- In office 15 October 1984 – 31 October 1996
- Preceded by: Gottfried Gurland
- Succeeded by: Hans Kremendahl

Member of the Landtag of North Rhine-Westphalia
- In office 1984–1990

Personal details
- Born: 2 August 1930 Neunkirchen, Saarland
- Died: 2 August 2021 (aged 91) Wuppertal, Germany
- Party: Social Democratic Party

Ursula Kraus (2 August 1930 – 2 August 2021) was a German politician. She was a member of the Social Democratic Party (SPD). Between 1984 until 1996, Kraus was Mayor of Wuppertal.

== Career ==
Born in Neunkirchen, Saarland, she left a gymnasium with the Mittlere Reife in 1949, and completed a commercial apprenticeship in 1951. She worked as industrial clerk (Industriekauffrau) until 1980, last as head of the internal sales group of a print shop.

Kraus was a member of the Printing and Paper Union from 1949, and also of the Arbeiterwohlfahrt. She joined the Social Democratic Party in 1956, working on the boards first of the local group, then from 1972 of an association concerned with labour (Arbeitsgemeinschaft für Arbeitnehmerfragen) in the district from 1972. She was on the board of the district (Bezirksvorstand) from 1975 to 1984, and on the state-wide board (Landesvorstand) from 1979.

Kraus was a member of the state parliament, the Landtag of North Rhine-Westphalia, elected in 1980. The same year, she became president of the association of social democratic women in Wuppertal (Arbeitsgemeinschaft Sozialdemokratische Frauen Wuppertal). She was from 1984 a member of the Wuppertal city government (Rat der Stadt). On 15 October 1984, she was elected as the first female mayor of Wuppertal, with all 37 votes from both parties, succeeding Gottfried Gurland. On 27 August 1988, she also became chairwoman of the supervisory board of the Wuppertaler Stadtwerke. She did not run for the NRW parliament in 1990, in order to focus on her duties as mayor. During her tenure, the Stadthalle was reopened after extensive restoration, and also the Von der Heydt-Museum. When she retired in 1996, she remained active in many groups, including the association for a new synagogue.

== Personal life ==
Her father, Friedrich Kraus, was a member of the Bundestag.

Kraus died in Wuppertal on her 91st birthday on 2 August 2021.

== Awards ==
On 4 June 1993, Kraus received the Order of Merit of North Rhine-Westphalia for her services to Wuppertal and her social activities. In 2002, she was awarded the Order of Merit of the Federal Republic of Germany. She was an honorary citizen of Wuppertal.
