= Alan Krause =

Australian rules footballer

Personal information
- Full name: Alan Ernst Krause
- Born: 14 August 1931
- Died: 27 June 2023 (aged 91)
- Original team: Black Rock
- Height: 188 cm (6 ft 2 in)
- Weight: 97 kg (214 lb)

Playing career^{1}
Years	Club	Games (Goals)
1951–53	Melbourne	12 (8)
1955–56	Sandringham (VFA)	
- ^{1} Playing statistics correct to the end of 1953.

Alan Ernst Krause (born 14 August 1931 – 27 June 2023) was an Australian rules footballer who played with Melbourne in the Victorian Football League (VFL).
