= Giuseppe Vincenzo Ciaccio =

Italian anatomist

Giuseppe Vincenzo Ciaccio (15 October 1824 in Catanzaro – 15 June 1901 in Bologna) was an Italian anatomist and histologist. His name is associated with accessory lacrimal glands known as "Ciaccio's glands".

In 1845, he earned his degree in medicine and surgery in Naples, afterwards opening a medical practice in Catanzaro, where in 1855 he attained the chair of theoretical surgery and obstetrics at the royal university-school. In 1860 he relocated to Turin, subsequently receiving a scholarship to study and work abroad. In London, he met with Thomas Spencer Wells (1818-1897) and Lionel Smith Beale (1828-1906), who was an important influence to Ciaccio in his decision to dedicate himself to microscopic anatomy. Following his stay in England, he traveled to Berlin, where he attended lectures by Rudolf Virchow (1821-1902) and performed histological studies of Pacinian corpuscles in the laboratory of Wilhelm Kühne (1837-1900).

In 1865, he was named professor of microscopic anatomy at the University of Naples, and two years later served as professor of experimental physiology at the University of Parma. From 1870 he was associated with the University of Bologna, working as a professor of comparative anatomy and histology.

In the fields of anatomy and histology, he is known for studies involving the finer structure of the eye (microscopic investigations of the conjunctiva, cornea and vitreous). He also made contributions involving research of peripheral nerve fiber terminations in vertebrates (e.g. torpedo fish).

== Selected publications ==
The following are a few of Ciaccio's many publications in anatomy and histology.

- Intorno al finale distribuimento de' nervi nell'organo elettrico della torpedine (Torpedo Narke, Risso), ibid.., II (1870)., pp. 5–9 - About the final distribution of nerves in the electric organs of torpedo fish.
- Osservazioni intorno alla struttura della congiuntiva umana, (ibid., s.1, IV [1874], p. 469-524) - Remarks about the structure of the human conjunctiva.
- Osservazioni intorno alla membrana del Descemet e al suo endotelio, con una descrizione anatomica dell'occhio della talpa europea, ibid., V (1875), pp. 501–516, e 2 tavole di 20figure - Observations on the Descemet membrane and its endothelium, with an anatomical description of the eye of the European mole.
- Osservazioni istologiche intorno alla terminazione delle fibre nervose motive ne' muscoli striati delle torpedini, del topo casalingo e del ratto albino condizionati col doppio cloruro d'oro e cadmio, ibid., IV (1882), pp. 821–830, e 2 tavole di 24figure - Observations involving motor nerve terminations in the striated muscle of torpedo fish, etc.
- Della minuta fabbrica degli occhi dei Ditteri, (ibid., s.4, VI [1884], pp. 605–660) - On the minute fabric involving the eyes of Diptera.
- Osservazioni microscopiche intorno agli organi elettrici delle torpedini, (ibid., s.5, VII [1899], p. 4tavole and 587-619). Microscopical observations involving the electric organs of torpedo fish.
