= Krause's glands =

Glands in the human eye

Krause's glands or Krause glands are small, mucous accessory lacrimal glands that are found underneath the eyelid where the upper and lower conjunctivae meet. Their ducts unite into a rather long sinus which open into the fornix conjunctiva. There are approximately forty Krause glands in the region of the upper eyelid, and around 6 to 8 in the region of the lower lid. The function of these glands are to produce tears which are secreted onto the surface of the conjunctiva.

There are rare instances of tumors associated with Krause's glands. They usually occur as retention cysts in cicatricial conditions of the conjunctiva. Krause's glands are named after German anatomist Karl Friedrich Theodor Krause (1797–1868).

== See also ==
- Ciaccio's glands
