= Katharina T. Kraus =

Professor of philosophy

Katharina Teresa Kraus

Academic background
- Education: University of Cambridge (PhD)
- Thesis: Psychological Knowledge in Kant's Critical Thinking (2014)

Academic work
- Era: Contemporary philosophy
- Region: Western philosophy
- Institutions: Johns Hopkins University
- Website: https://www.katharinatkraus.com/

Katharina Teresa Kraus is an associate professor of philosophy at Johns Hopkins University. Before joining Johns Hopkins University she was associate professor at the University of Notre Dame.

== Life and works ==
After completing her studies in physics, mathematics, and philosophy, she earned a Diplom in physics (equivalent to a combined BA and MA) from the Ruprecht-Karls University of Heidelberg in 2008. She then received an MPhil in history and philosophy of science in 2010, followed by a PhD in philosophy in 2014, both from the University of Cambridge.

Her 2020 book, Kant on Self-Knowledge and Self-Formation has been the subject of multiple reviews from Ekin Erkan, Pirachula Chulanon, Béatrice Longuenesse, Yibin Liang, Allen Wood, Patrick R. Frierson, Janum Sethi, Clinton Tolley, and Stefanie Buchenau followed by a Précis response from Kraus. This work was also subject of a book symposium by the Review for the Society of German Idealism and Romanticism in 2022 including reviews from Karin Nisenbaum and Julia Peters, also followed by a reply from Kraus.

In December 2025 she started a Professorship in Philosophy of the Enlightenment and Modernity at the University of Vienna.

=== Publications ===
- Kraus, Katharina T. (2020). Kant on Self-Knowledge and Self-Formation. doi:10.1017/9781108874304. ISBN 978-1-108-87430-4.
- Kraus, Katharina T. (2025). Kant's Ideas of Reason. doi:10.1017/9781009024273. ISBN 978-1-009-02427-3.
