= Krauss =

Krauss is a German surname. Notable people with the surname include:

- Alison Krauss (born 1971), American bluegrass musician
- Alexander Krauß (born 1975), German politician
- Alexis Krauss (born 1985), musician of the noise pop duo Sleigh Bells
- Amy Krauss (1876–1961), British artist
- Anna Krauss (1884–1943) German clairvoyant
- Beatrice Krauss (1903–1998), American botanist
- Benjamin Krauss (1969) American professor
- Clemens Krauss (1893–1954), Austrian conductor
- Clementine Krauss (1877-1938), Austrian ballerina, operetta singer, director, and actress
- Charles A. W. Krauss (1851–1939), American politician
- Christian Ferdinand Friedrich Krauss (1812–1890), known as Ferdinand Krauss, German scientist, traveller and collector
- Friedrich Salomon Krauss (1859–1938), Austrian ethnographer
- Gabrielle Krauss (1842–1906), Austrian-born French operatic soprano
- Georg Krauß, (1826–1906), German industrialist and the founder of the Krauss Locomotive Works
  - Krauss-Maffei, German engineering company, named in part after Georg Krauß
- Hermann August Krauss (1848–1937), Austrian entomologist
- Johan Carl Krauss (1759–1826), German physician and botanist
- Konrad Krauss (born 1938), German actor
- Lawrence M. Krauss (born 1954), American physicist and writer
- Michael E. Krauss (1934–2019), American linguist
- Michael I. Krauss (born 1951), American law professor
- Nicole Krauss (born 1974), American novelist
- Oliver Krauß (born 1969), German politician
- Rosalind E. Krauss (born 1941), American art critic
- Ruth Krauss (1901–1993), American poet, playwright and children's book author
- Samuel Krauss (1866–1948), Hungarian philologist and historian
- Thomas F Krauss, British physicist working in the field of photonic crystals
- Werner Krauss (1884–1959), German actor
- Werner Krauss (academic) (1900–1976), German professor of Romance studies

== See also ==
- Kraus
- Krause
- Krauze
- Krausz
