= Charles Kraus (clown) =

American clown, magician, writer, and comedian

- Born: July 26, 1946 (age 80); New York, NY
- Other names: Charles the Clown; Charles the Magician
- Occupation: children's entertainer
- Years active: 1972–present
- Spouse: Linda Kirschner Kraus
- Website: http://www.charlestheclown.com/

Charles Kraus, (born July 26, 1946) also known as "Charles the Clown", is an American clown, magician, writer, and comedian.

== Biography ==
=== Early life ===
Kraus was born in New York City. He attended acting classes in various Manhattan drama schools including summer classes at the American Academy of Dramatic Arts, for three years was a student of Jack Miller, well known magic teacher and Dean of the Society of American Magicians. He acted in 8 plays at the New London Barn Playhouse, and performed a Houdini escape routine at the Rivera Terrace Night Club on Broadway. Kraus graduated from The Roosevelt School in Stamford, Connecticut, attended Emerson College, Columbia College Chicago, and received a BA from California State University in Los Angeles. He attended graduate school at California State University Northridge and the University of West Los Angeles. He spent one year teaching media studies at Lane Community College in Eugene, Oregon.

=== Career ===
A well-known children's entertainer and author, Kraus has performed shows throughout the United States, as well as overseas. He stars in the "Charles the Clown" performance video produced by A&M Records. It was taped on the Charlie Chaplin Sound Stage where Chaplin filmed many of his movies and where Red Skelton shot his variety program. Charles is also known for his children's audio stories, Cross Country Cats Not Just Clowning Around, and Tall Tales & Tall Tales.

With his wife, psychologist Linda Kirschner Kraus, he wrote Charles the Clown's Guide To Children's Parties, a book published by Jalmar Press. In 2015 his book The Teen Magician That's You was published by Otherthannow. He has written and recorded 20 children's stories. In the 1980s Kraus was the Articles Editor for LA Home & Entertaining Magazine. His articles have appeared in many newspapers and magazines including The Baltimore Sun, Los Angeles Times, Chicago Tribune and USA Today.

As Charles the Magician, Kraus began appearing on television in the 1950s. He was the junior magician on the Magic Clown television show in New York. Later, he performed on Ted Mack's Original Amateur Hour. Kraus wrote, produced and starred in five specials for Teleprompter Cable Television, and has appeared on more than 75 television and radio shows. As the "Kraft Foods Children's Party Expert", he appeared on television and radio shows throughout the Midwestern United States. He was a consultant and appears in Children at Risk, funded by the U.S. Department of Education and Washington.

After serving in the US Navy and Construction Battalion during the Vietnam War, he returned to the United States and began experimenting with clown routines. Since then, "Charles The Clown" has performed thousands of live shows for movie, television, sports stars and entertainment industry figures. He has appeared at the Roxy Theatre on Hollywood's Sunset Strip, Disneyland, Knotts Berry Farm, in theaters and festivals, schools, libraries and other venues.

In 1972, Kraus worked in Music Clearance at CBS Television City in Hollywood. Then, for four years, he was the public service coordinator at KLCS-TV, where in addition to working in a management position, he wrote educational scripts and appeared in numerous television productions. During this period he was an associate producer at "Time Capsule" a syndicated radio program.
