= Paul Kraus =

Australian writer and Holocaust survivor

- Paul Kraus's birth certificate (St. Pölten, Austria archives)
- Born: October 20, 1944; St. Pölten, Austria
- Died: July 2024 (aged 79)

Paul Kraus (October 1944 – July 2024) was a Holocaust survivor and mesothelioma patient. Kraus was born in and survived a Nazi forced labor camp during World War II. In 1997, Kraus was diagnosed with mesothelioma, a type of cancer caused by asbestos. Doctors originally believed that the cancer was terminal and that he had only weeks to live, but Kraus was for 29 years considered to be the longest-lived mesothelioma survivor. Kraus was an Australian author and cancer survivor whose writings focused on Australia, health, and spirituality. His book Surviving Mesothelioma and Other Cancers: A Patient’s Guide is a best-selling book on the subject.

== Viehofen Forced-Labor camp ==
Paul's mother, Clara Kraus, a Hungarian Jew, had a two-year-old boy, Peter, and was pregnant with Paul when the Nazis deported her and her children to Auschwitz concentration camp. Due to rail destruction by Allied bombing, they were sent to a forced labor camp established in the Viehofen flood plain near St. Pölten, Lower Austria. Approximately 180 men, women and children lived in three barracks in the camp where they were used as forced labor for the state-owned Traisen-Wasserverband company based in St. Pölten and the surrounding area.

Paul Kraus was born on the grounds of the camp on 20 October 1944. Inadequate nutrition, lack of hygiene, shootings by the SS, failed attempts to escape, and bombings by the Allies caused many deaths at the camp. Clara Kraus escaped with her toddler Peter and infant son Paul in January 1945 and survived a cross-country trek in winter to Clara's home in German-occupied Budapest. There, she was reunited with her husband, who survived imprisonment in the Mauthausen-Gusen concentration camp. At the end of World War II, the family emigrated to Australia.

== Mesothelioma ==
Paul Kraus received his Bachelor of Arts degree at Macquarie University and a Master of Arts and Education from the University of Sydney. During a summer vacation as an undergraduate student, he worked adjacent to an asbestos factory, where he was exposed to fine asbestos dust. Decades later, he was diagnosed with peritoneal mesothelioma, a cancer known to be caused by exposure from asbestos. Due to his advanced metastases, doctors believed he only had weeks to live.

For more than 30 years, Kraus worked as an author and educator. He wrote several books, including books co-written with Ian Gawler. Kraus passed away in July, 2024 at the age of 79.

== Selected works ==
- Faith, Hope, Love and Laughter – How They Heal
- Not So Fabulous 50s: Images of a Migrant Childhood
- A New Australian, a New Australia
- Surviving Cancer: Inspirational Stories of Hope and Healing
- Prayers, Promises & Prescriptions for Healing
- Surviving Mesothelioma and Other Cancers: A Patient's Guide
- Mother Courage: From the Holocaust to Australia
