= Reuf Duraković =

Footballer (born 1994)

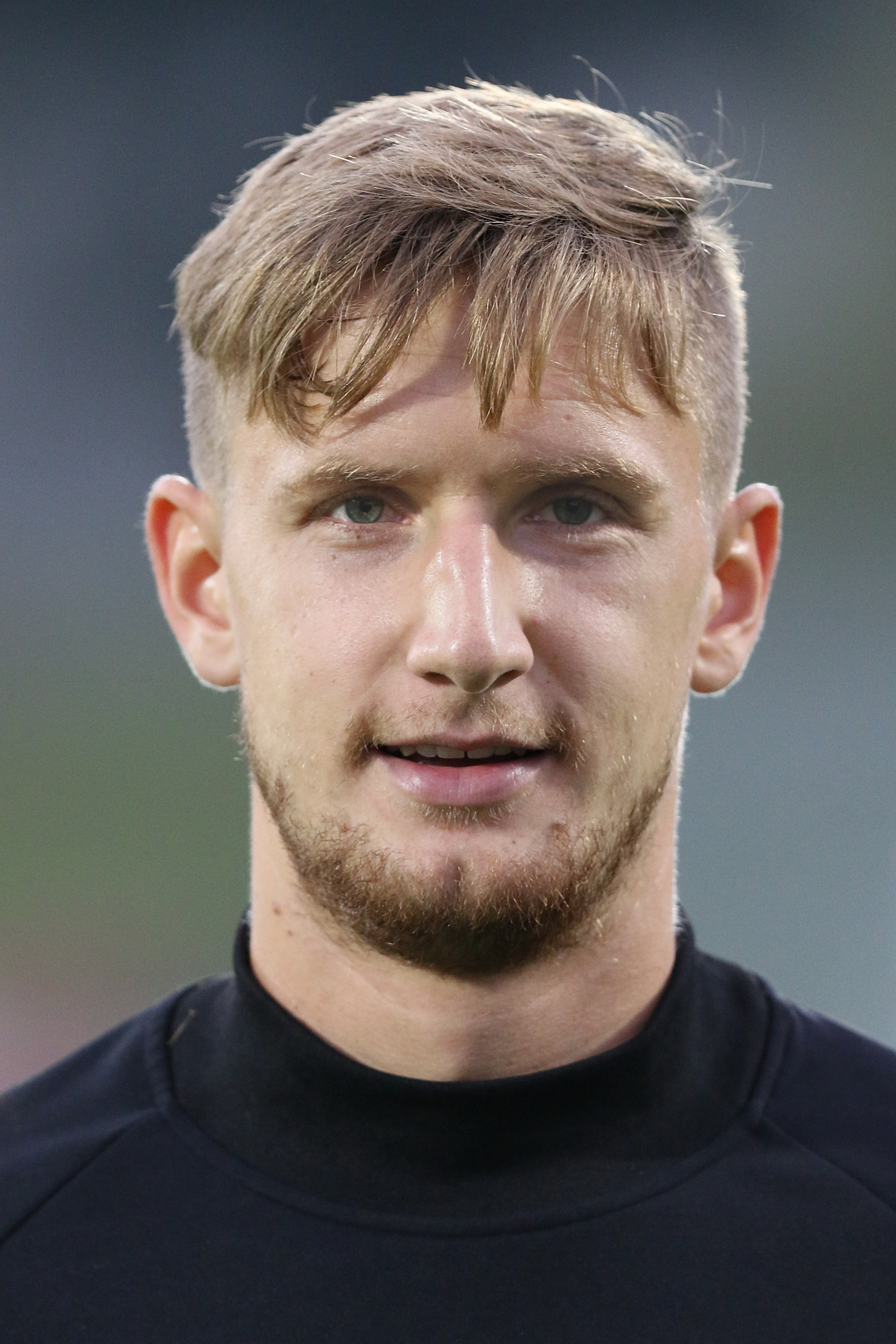

Personal information
- Date of birth: 21 March 1994 (age 32)
- Place of birth: Feldkirch, Austria
- Height: 1.97 m (6 ft 6 in)
- Position: Goalkeeper

Youth career
- –2010: Lustenau

Senior career*
Years	Team	Apps	(Gls)
2010–2013	Lustenau	24	(0)
2013	→ Varese (loan)	0	(0)
2014	FC Dornbirn	14	(0)
2014–2018	SV Ried	6	(0)
2019–2020	SCR Altach II	4	(0)
2019–2020	SCR Altach	3	(0)

International career
2012	Bosnia and Herzegovina U19	1	(0)
- * Club domestic league appearances and goals as of 2 June 2020

Reuf Duraković (born 21 March 1994) is a footballer who plays as a goalkeeper for FC Nenzing. Born in Austria, he represented Bosnia and Herzegovina at under-19 international level.

Duraković's family moved from Bužim to Lustenau before he was born.
