= Ernst Henry Krause =

American physicist

Ernst H. Krause (2 May 1913 in Milwaukee, Wisconsin – 23 August 1989 in Newport Beach, California) was an American nuclear physicist and aerospace executive. He participated in early radar and rocketry research at the Naval Research Laboratory as the first chairman of the Upper Atmosphere Research Panel, working with Milton Rosen and succeeded by James Van Allen. His body of work includes experiments studying the upper atmosphere after World War II using captured V-2 rockets. From 1947 to 1951 he was involved in the first atomic testing at Enewetak Atoll in the Pacific, and later worked at the Lockheed Missiles and Space Company. In 1955 he started the Systems Research Corporation, which later became Ford Aerospace.

== Selected publications ==
- The Sensitized Fluorescence of Potassium (PhD thesis, U. Wisconsin at Madison, 1938)
- Cosmic Radiation Above 40 Miles, Physical Review 70,223 (1946)
- Additional Cosmic-Ray Measurements with the V-2 Rocket, Physical Review 70,776 (1946)
- Further Cosmic-Ray Experiments above the Atmosphere, Physical Review 71,918 (1947)
- V-2 Cloud-Chamber Observation of a Multiply Charged Primary Cosmic Ray, Physical Review 75,524 (1949)

== Selected patents ==
- U.S. patent 2,538,017: Modulation-on-pulse control systems
- U.S. patent 2,567,944: Pulse group selectors
- U.S. patent 2,568,750: Discriminator circuits
- U.S. patent 2,610,793: Electric counting and integration system
- U.S. patent 2,679,041: Remote echo ranging system
- U.S. patent 4,005,818: Pulse signaling system
- U.S. patent 4,163,872: Secret pulse signaling system
