= Joseph Anton Kraus =

German sculptor

Joseph Anton Kraus (died 21 January 1721, Danzig/Gdańsk) was a German sculptor of the eighteenth century, working primarily in the Polish-Litunanian Commonwealth and the Kingdom of Prussia. His date of birth and death are unknown.

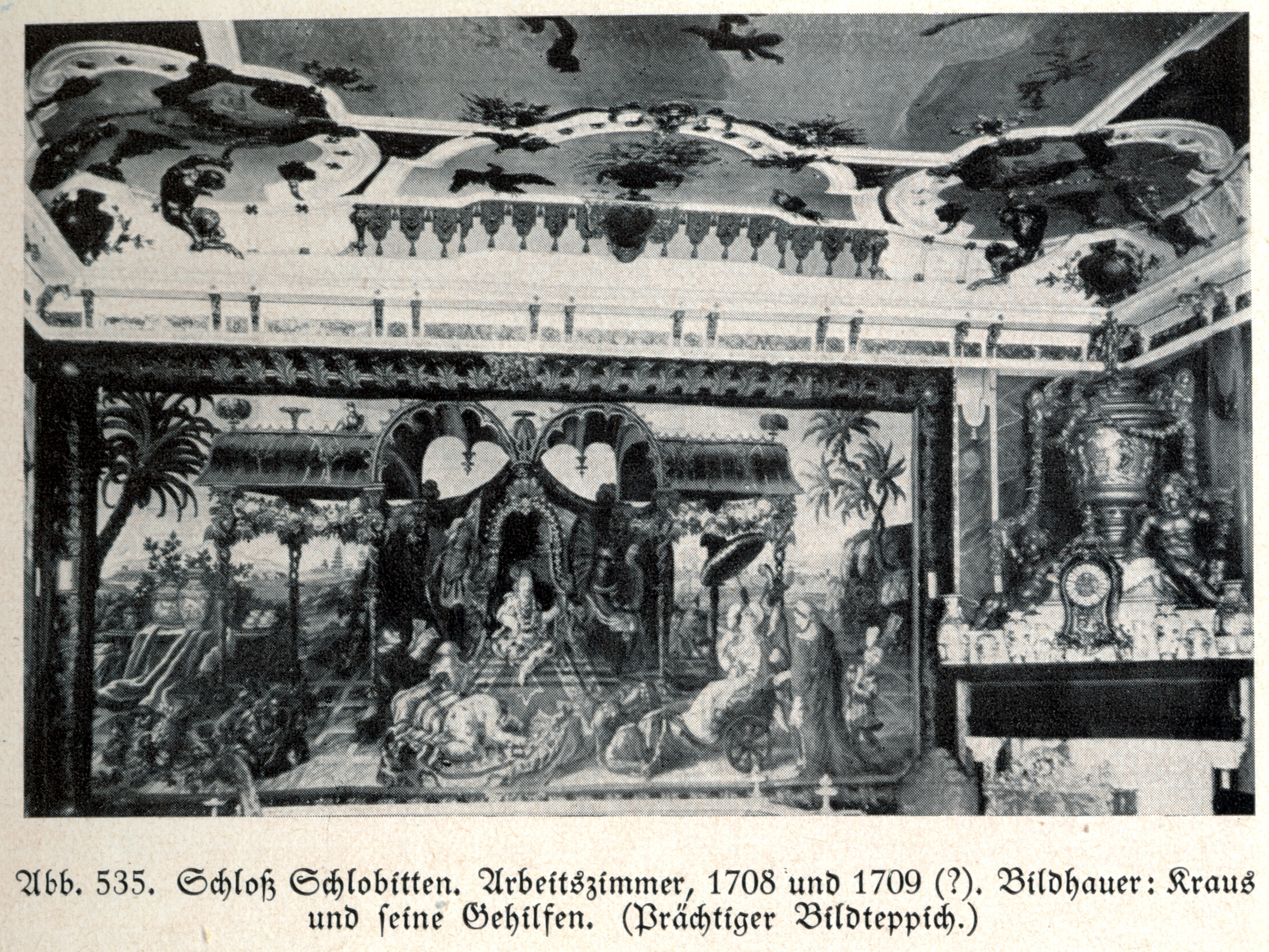
Interior of Słobity Palace

Kraus married Elisabeth née Frauensohn in Berlin in 1705. He was associated with the workshop of the royal Prussian sculptor Georg Gottfried Weyhenmeyer, where he had the opportunity to work with Andreas Schlüter. In 1708, he came to Schlobitten (Słobity), where he was commissioned by Alexander zu Dohna in 1719, for whom he created sculptural decorations of the palace and park. In 1711 he lived in Königsberg (Kaliningrad), where he worked on additional projects. He decorated two confessionals for the cathedral of Marienwerder (Kwidzyń) in 1716. He is also credited with the altar of the church of St. John the Baptist in Bartenstein (Bartoszyce) (1715 to 1720). In 1716, at the request of Bogislaw Friedrich von Dönhoff Kraus made an altar and the confessional in the church in Dönhoffstädt (Drogosze) (destroyed)). Around 1719 he was active in Gdańsk. He was a contractor producing sculptural decorations for the church of the Jesuits in Grudziądz, 1715–1740 (contract for the main altar signed in 1721).
