= Ernst Krause (musicologist) =

German musicologist

Ernst Krause (28 May 1911 – 8 August 1997) was a German musicologist and opera critic.

== Life ==
Born in Dresden, Krause studied German and art history at the Goethe University Frankfurt. As a music critic, he first published in the Frankfurter General-Anzeiger. In 1939, he moved to his hometown and worked as a journalist at the Dresdner Nachrichten. From 1945 he was cultural editor for the Sächsische Zeitung. From 1952, Krause worked as a critic for the Tägliche Rundschau, from 1955 for the National-Zeitung and from 1958 for the Sonntag.

In 1955 Krause published his Strauss essay Richard Strauss - Gestalt und Werk (which was translated into six languages) and later Richard Strauss - Der letzte Romantiker. His compendium Opera from A-Z, which has been published in numerous editions, is considered a standard work.

In his books, Krause did not content himself with the life sketches of the composers from 3 ½ centuries, he followed the traces of their work, their place in history and present.

Krause died in Berlin at the age of 86.

== Honours ==
- In 1964 Krause was appointed vice-president of the International Richard Strauss Society in Vienna.
- On 27 January 1987, he was awarded an honorary doctorate of philosophy at the Humboldt University of Berlin.

== Work ==
- Opernsänger
- Puccini – Beschreibung eines Welterfolgs.
- Werner Egk Oper und Ballett.
