= Ernst Krause (biologist) =

German biologist (1839–1903)

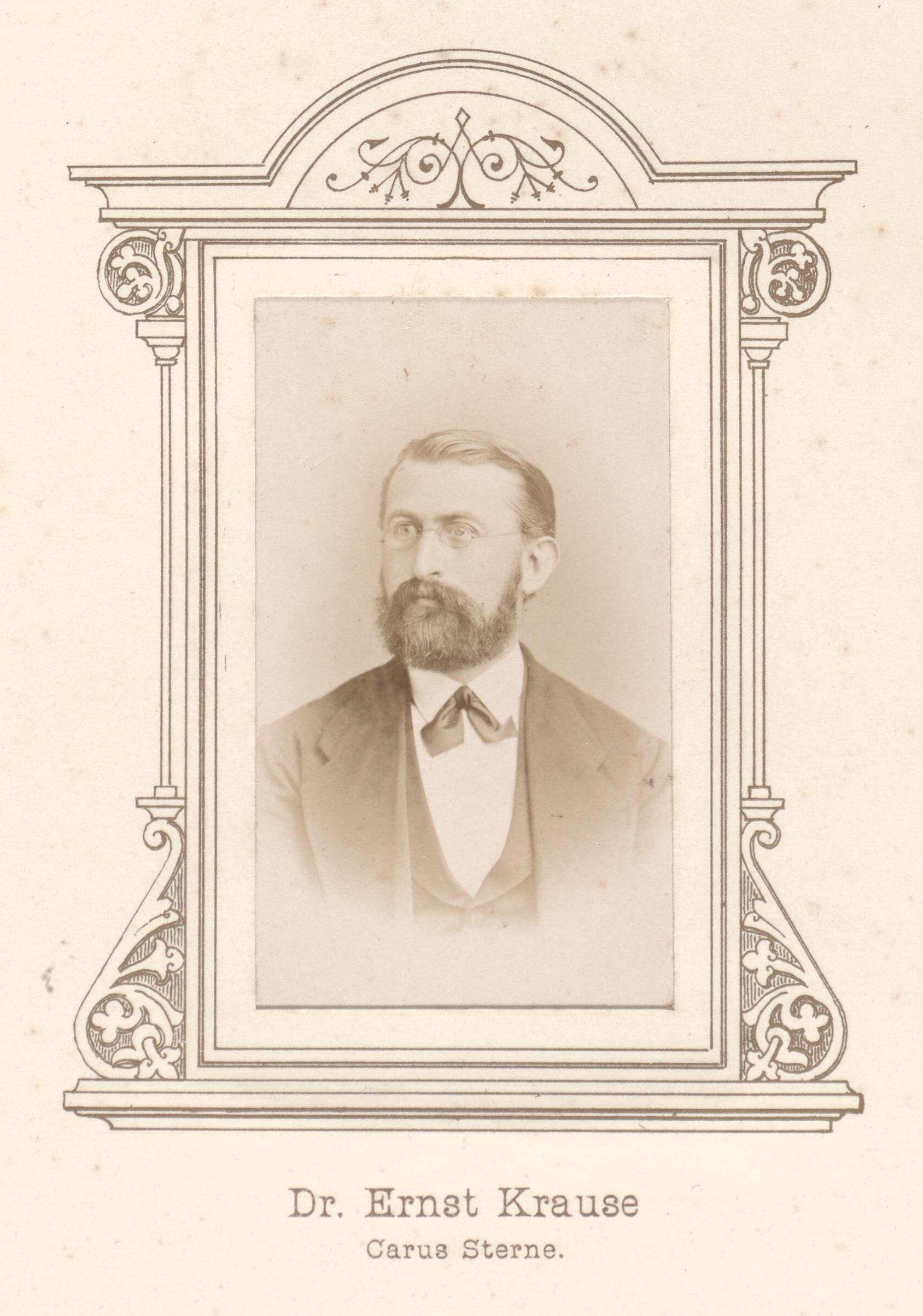
Ernst Krause (1839–1903)

Ernst Ludwig Krause also known under the pen-name Carus Sterne (22 November 1839 in Zielenzig, – 24 August 1903 in Eberswalde) was a German pharmacist and naturalist. Sterne was noted for his popular writing on the subjects of nature, the history of science and human psychology.

== Biography ==
Krause was born in Zielenzig to Ernst Friedrich and Eleonore. He grew up in Neumark, studying in Meseritz where he became introduced to the natural sciences through the secondary school teacher Herman Loew. He trained as a pharmacist and then worked in the Küstrin garrison hospital as a pharmacist as part of military service. In 1862 he attended lectures at Berlin by Gustav Magnus, Eilhard Mitscherlich, Gustav Rose, Otto Berg and Alexander Braun. He passed the state examination and worked as a pharmacist in Düsseldorf and Berlin. He wrote in the newspapers and periodicals on popular science topics. He was critical of spiritualism and parapsychology and approached it through the materialist philosophy of the natural sciences. In 1866 he wrote on the natural history of ghosts. In 1874 he went to the University of Rostock where he received a doctorate in botany in relation to morphology. In 1877 he started, with support from Ernst Haeckel, a journal called Kosmos to provide a view on evolution. He wrote a Darwinian creation story Werden und Vergehen in 1876 which went into six editions by 1905. This included an ethnic theory of "Nordic Greekness" which received much criticism. He moved from living in Berlin to Eberswalde where he died.

== Selected works ==
- Die Naturgeschichte der Gespenster. Physikalisch-physiologisch-psychologische Studien, Weimar 1863 – The natural history of ghosts. Physico-physiological-psychological studies.
- Werden und Vergehen eine Entwicklungsgeschichte des Naturganzen in gemeinverständlicher Fassung (11 editions published between 1876 and 1907) – Growth and decay, a history of the whole of nature in a common sense approach.
- "Erasmus Darwin", (30 editions published between 1879 and 2009 in English and German). Published in German as "Erasmus Darwin und seine Stellung in der Geschichte der Descendenz-Theorie" (biography of Erasmus Darwin, translated from the German by W.S. Dallas; with a preliminary notice by Charles Darwin).
- Charles Darwin und sein Verhältnis zu Deutschland (10 editions published between 1885 and 1887) – Charles Darwin and his relationship in Germany.
- Die allgemeine Weltanschauung in ihrer historischen Entwickelung, Stuttgart 1889 – The general world belief in historical development.
- Natur und Kunst. Studien zur Entwicklungsgeschichte der Kunst, 1891 – Nature and Art: Studies on the Evolution of Art.
- Geschichte der biologischen Wissenschaften im 19. Jahrhundert, Berlin 1901 – History of biological sciences in the 19th Century.

Krause was also the author of numerous articles in the journal Die Gartenlaube.
