= Karl Friedrich Theodor Krause =

German anatomist (1797–1868)

Karl Friedrich Theodor Krause (15 December 1797 – 8 June 1868) was a German anatomist born in Hanover.

In 1818 he received his medical doctorate from the University of Göttingen, and later attained the chair of anatomy at the surgical school in Hanover. His son Wilhelm Krause (1833–1910) was also an anatomist.

Krause was one of the first anatomists to make extensive use of the microscope. He was the first physician to describe the transverse perineal ligament, sometimes referred to as "Krause's ligament". He also described the accessory tear glands of the eye. These glands are found under the eyelids where the lower and upper conjunctiva meet, and are sometimes known as "Krause's glands".
