= Martin Kraus (footballer, born 1993) =

Austrian footballer

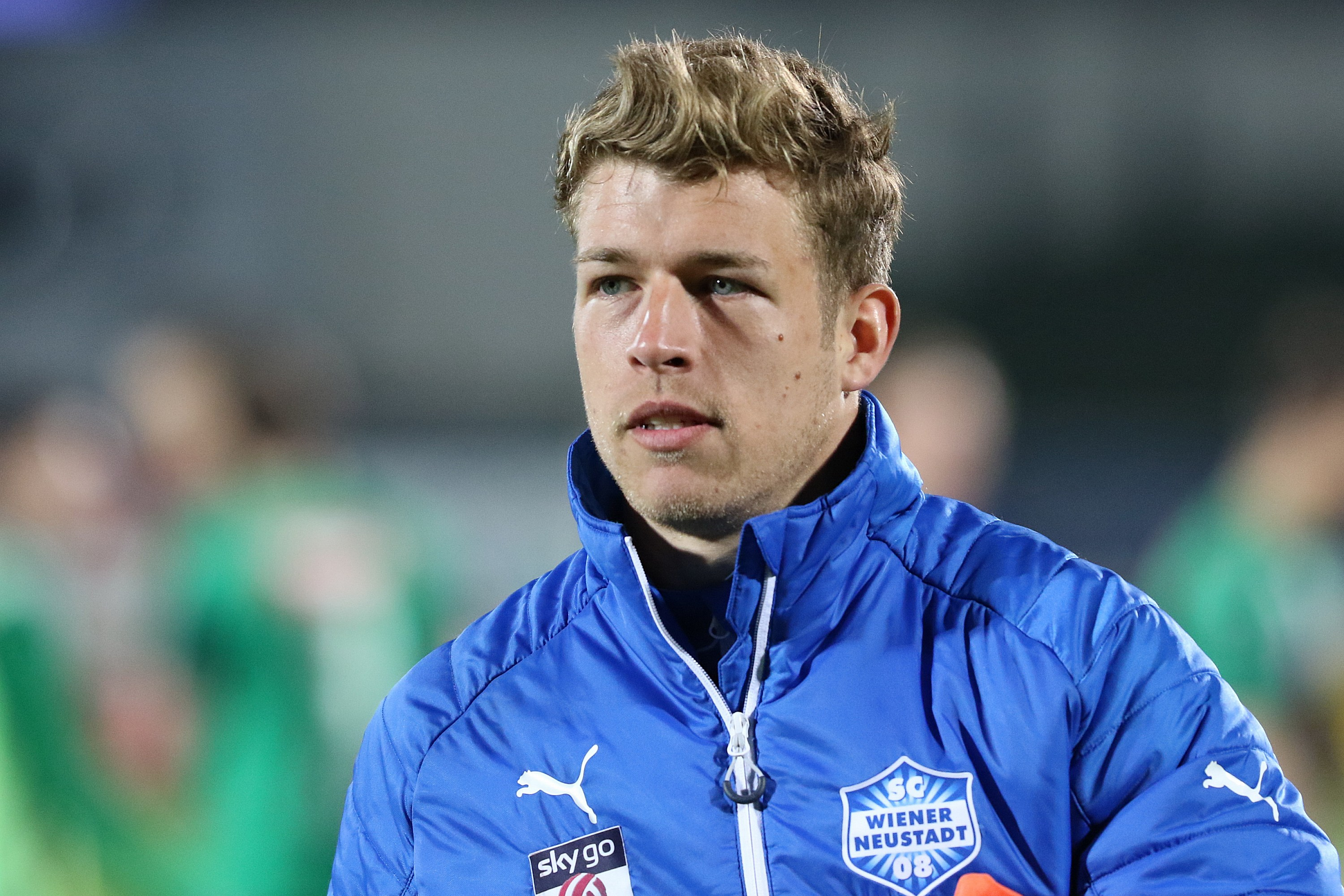
- Martin Kraus in 2016

Personal information
- Date of birth: 24 October 1993 (age 33)
- Place of birth: Mödling, Austria
- Height: 1.81 m (5 ft 11 1/2 in)
- Position: Goalkeeper

Team information
- Current team: SV Oberwart
- Number: 33

Youth career
- 2000–2005: ASV Vösendorf
- 2005–2008: Brunn/Gebirge
- 2008–2009: Team Wiener Linien
- 2009–2010: Rapid Wien

Senior career*
Years	Team	Apps	(Gls)
2010–2012	Rapid Wien II	13	(0)
2011–2012	→ Columbia (loan)	30	(0)
2012–2013	1. SC Sollenau	30	(0)
2013–2014	SC Ritzing	6	(0)
2014–2015	Austria Klagenfurt	3	(0)
2016	Wiener Neustadt	1	(0)
2016–2018	Wiener SC	59	(0)
2018–2019	Admira Wacker II	1	(0)
2019–2020	Neusiedl am See	33	(0)
2021–2022	FC Marchfeld	28	(0)
2023	Wiener Neustädter	12	(0)
2023–2025	SC-ESV Parndorf	70	(0)
2026–	SV Oberwart	16	(0)
- * Club domestic league appearances and goals as of 28 June 2026

Martin Kraus (born 24 October 1993) is an Austrian footballer who currently plays for SV Oberwart.
