= BMW K1200GT =

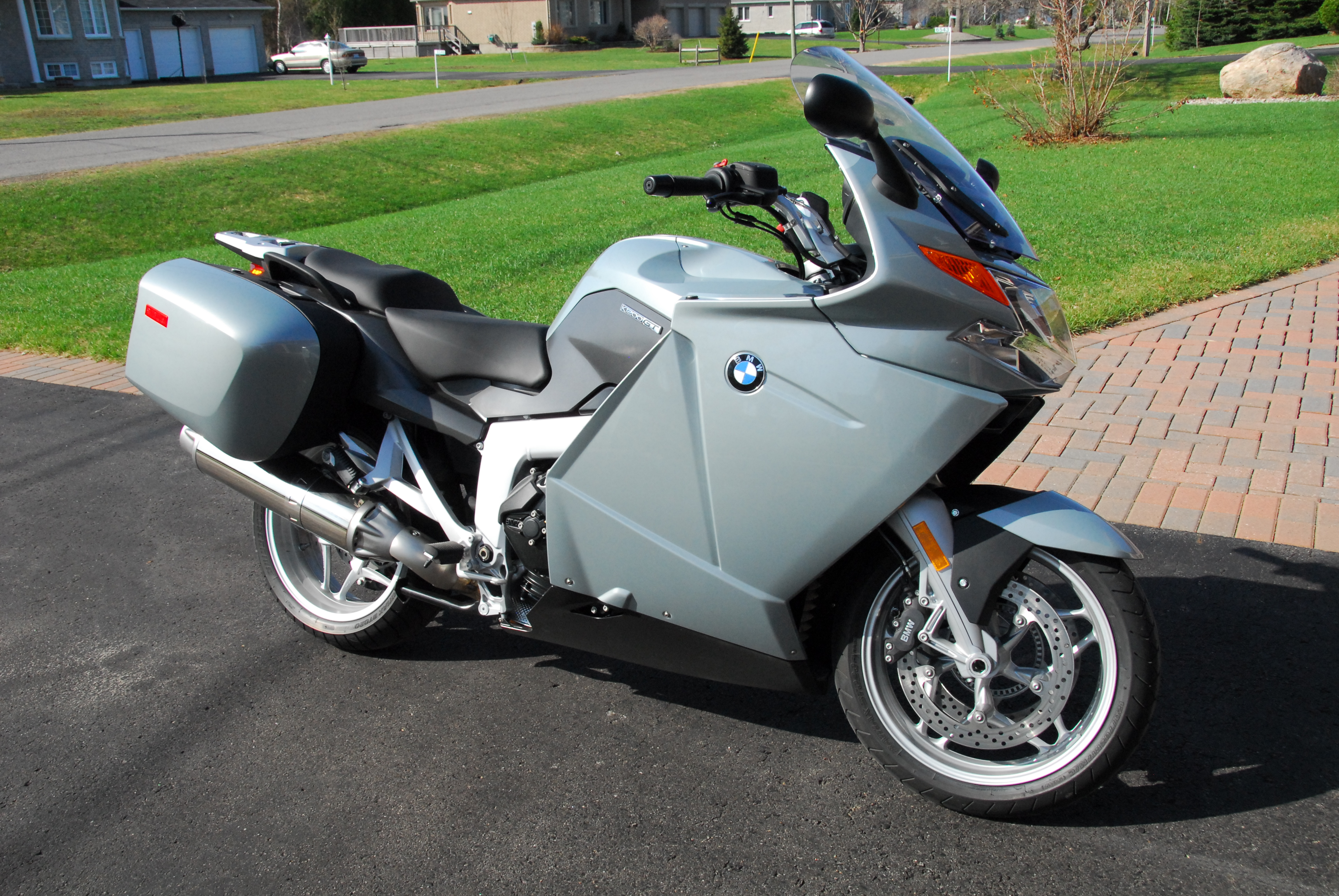
- 2007 K1200GT
- Manufacturer: BMW Motorrad
- Production: 2003–2008
- Predecessor: K1200GT (2003–2006)
- Successor: K1300GT
- Class: Sport touring
- Engine: 1,157 cc (70.6 cu in) liquid-cooled transverse mounted inline 4-cylinder DOHC
- Bore / stroke: 79 mm × 59 mm (3.1 in × 2.3 in)
- Compression ratio: 13.1:1
- Top speed: 2003: 230 km/h (143 mph); 2006: 253 km/h (157 mph)
- Power: 2003: 77.3 kW (103.7 hp) (rear wheel); 2006: 92.1 kW (123.5 hp) (rear wheel)
- Torque: 2003: 99.9 N⋅m (73.7 lb⋅ft); 2006: 108.1 N⋅m (79.7 lb⋅ft)
- Transmission: 6-speed, enclosed driveshaft with two universal joints; 2.82:1 drive ratio
- Suspension: Front: Duolever fork Rear: monoshock
- Rake, trail: 29.4°, 112 mm (4.4 in)
- Wheelbase: 1,572 mm (61.9 in)
- Dimensions: L: 2,318 mm (91.3 in); W: 990 mm (39 in) with panniers H: 1,438 mm (56.6 in)
- Seat height: 820–840 mm (32–33 in)
- Weight: 2003: 309 kg (681 lb); 2006: 303 kg (668 lb) (wet)
- Fuel capacity: 24 L (5.3 imp gal; 6.3 US gal) including 4 L reserve
- Fuel consumption: 2003: 6.19 L/100 km; 45.6 mpg_{‑imp} (38.0 mpg_{‑US}); 2006: 5.55 L/100 km; 50.9 mpg_{‑imp} (42.4 mpg_{‑US})
- Related: K1200R, K1200S

The BMW K1200GT is a sport-touring motorcycle made by BMW. The first generation K1200GT came out in 2003 and had a traditional “Brick” longitudinally mounted four cylinder engine. Criticisms of this model included its weight, lack of power, and poor ground clearance, but it still rated as a very comfortable and high-speed tourer. The second-generation K1200GT, introduced in 2006, uses essentially the same inline-4 engine as the BMW K1200S sportbike, which held the world speed record in 2005 for its class at 279.33 km/h (173.57 mph), and the K1200R. The new model was lighter and more powerful than the 2003 first-generation K1200GT.

The K1200GT's standard equipment includes an adjustable seat and handlebars, integral ABS, dry sump lubrication, panniers, and electronically adjustable screen. Available options include: electronic suspension adjustment (ESA), xenon light, onboard computer including oil level warning, automatic stability control (ASC), heated seat, heated hand grips, tire pressure monitoring (TPM), cruise control and anti-theft alarm.

== K1300GT ==
In late 2008, the K1200GT was replaced by the K1300GT, which had a 1,293 cc (78.9 cu in) larger displacement engine producing 160 bhp (119 kW) and 99 lb⋅ft (134 N⋅m) of torque at the crankshaft. Cycle World tested the K1300GT at 105.2 kW (141.1 hp) and 86.0 lb⋅ft (116.6 N⋅m) torque at the rear wheel. The new bike also had improved optional ESA-II electronic suspension adjustment, a conventional single indicator switch and concealed crash bars.
