= BMW K1200R =

K1200R
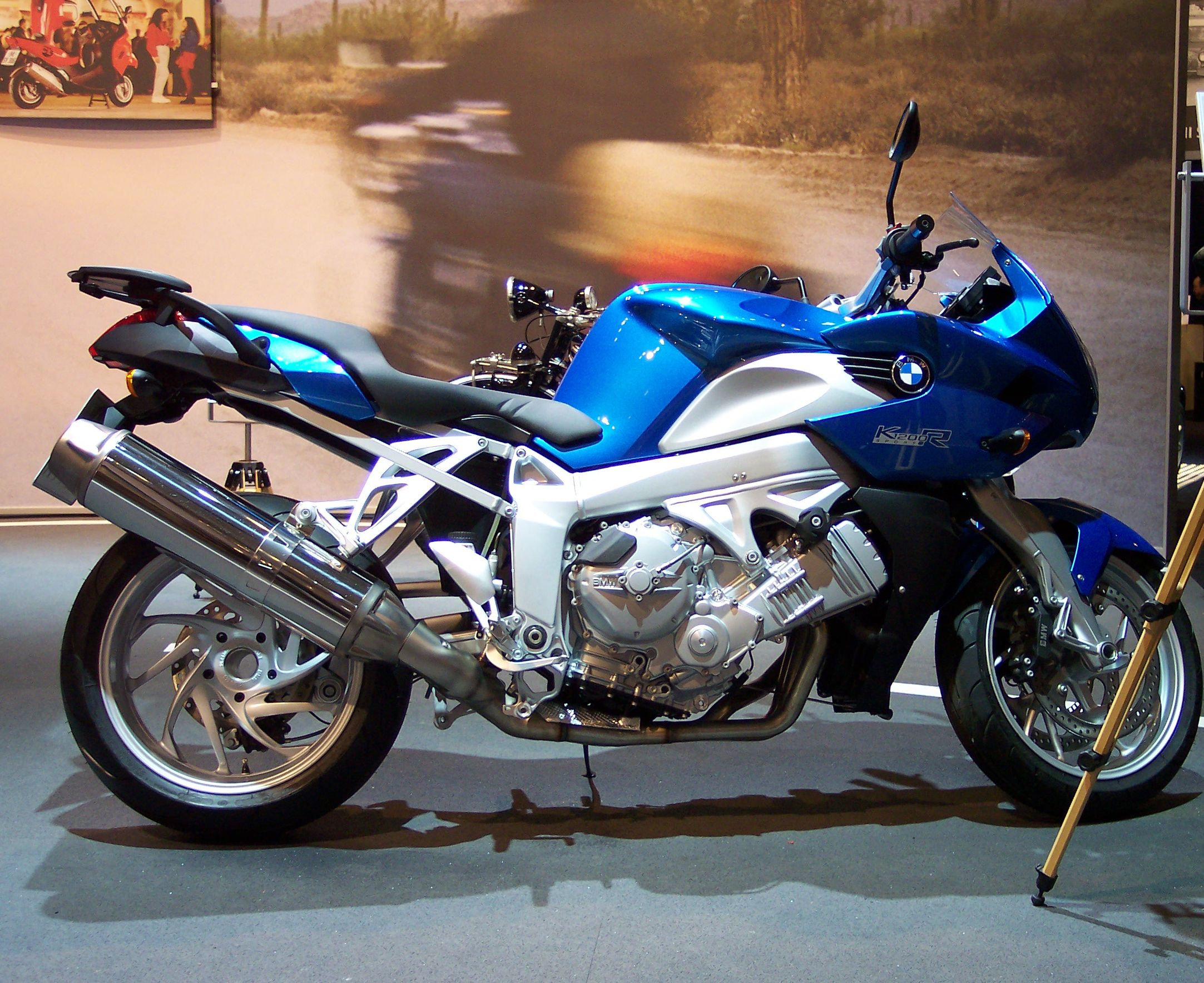
- Manufacturer: BMW Motorrad
- Also called: K1200R Sport
- Production: 2005–2008
- Successor: K1300R
- Class: Naked
- Engine: 1,157 cc (70.6 cu in) inline-4, EFI, anti-knock sensor
- Bore / stroke: 79 mm × 59 mm (3.11 in × 2.32 in)
- Compression ratio: 13.0:1
- Power: 163 hp (122 kW) @ 10,250 rpm (2009, claimed)
- Torque: 94 ft·lbf (127 N·m) @ 8,250 rpm
- Suspension: Front: Duolever fork Rear: monoshock ESA electronically adjustable
- Brakes: Dual disc front, disc rear (optional ABS)
- Weight: 237.0 kg (522.5 lb) (2009, claimed) 250 kg (550 lb) (2006) (wet)
- Related: K1200GT, K1200S

The BMW K1200R is a naked supersport motorcycle manufactured between 2005 and 2008 by BMW Motorrad, producing a claimed 163 hp (122 kW) @ 10,250 rpm from its transverse-mounted 1,157 cc inline-four engine with torque of 94 lbf⋅ft (127 N⋅m) @ 8,250 rpm. Acceleration to 60 mph (97 km/h) from a standing start is claimed to be 2.6 seconds.

The cylinder block is canted toward the front wheel by 55 degrees to reduce the entire motorcycle's centre of gravity, allowing intake components to be placed above the engine, directly below the fuel tank. The optional electronic suspension adjustment (ESA) system allows the rider to electronically adjust for different road conditions and varying loads for an individualized riding style. A three-way catalytic converter in the exhaust is present to meet low emissions. As an option, the bike is available with ABS brakes.

In 2007, the K1200R Sport was launched, which is identical other than the addition of a small fairing.

At the time of launch, BMW Motorrad claimed that the K1200R was the world's most powerful naked bike. This was exceeded when Suzuki launched the 184 hp (137 kW) Suzuki B-King. British magazine RiDE tested the B-King and K1200R together and found that despite the extra power of the B-King, the K1200R was faster accelerating and had a 9 mph (14 km/h) higher top speed.

At the end of 2008, the K1200R was replaced by the larger displacement K1300R, which features a 1,293 cc engine producing 175 bhp (130 kW), torque of 103 lb⋅ft (140 N⋅m).

The K1200R was sold in the US.
