= Cyberpathology =

Health effects of excessive computer use

Cyberpathology refers to the phenomena that "individuals can become overly attached to their computers, computer games, or the Internet and spend inordinate amounts of time in front of their monitors". It may cause physical and psychological damages to the individual, for examples, insufficient amount of sleep, limited face-to-face interactions, and impacting on daily life activities.

Cyberpathology shares many of the same core symptoms of behavioral addictions, such as salience, mood modification, tolerance, withdrawal symptoms, conflict, and relapse.

== Mental health ==
Psychiatry & neuropsychiatry are the two primary specialties.

=== Disorder categories ===
==== 1. Computer and internet addiction ====
- Cybersex
- Online gambling
- Online auctions
- Online communications/Computer-mediated communication

==== 2. Computer anxiety ====
In contrast to computer and Internet addiction, computer anxiety refers to "a state of heightened tension or a feeling of apprehensive expectation". Behavioral presentations of computer anxiety include: "(1) avoidance of computers and the general areas where computers are located; (2) excessive caution with computers; (3) negative remarks about computers; and (4) attempts to cut short the necessary use of computers". Computer anxiety is mainly assessed by self-report scales using Likert-type formats.

Age, gender, and computer experience are thought to be associated with computer anxiety. A meta-analysis based on studies published between 1990 and 1996 found that: (1) female university undergraduates are generally more anxious than male undergraduates, but the strength of this relationship is not conclusive; (2) instruments measuring computer anxiety are generally reliable, but not compatible with one another; and (3) computer anxiety is inversely related to computer experience, but the strength of this relationship remains inconclusive. However, Bozionelos found that the youngest sample with the presumably earliest exposure to computerization reported the highest computer anxiety scores and demonstrated the highest prevalence rates. Also, Wilfong found that computer experience did not have the largest significant relationship with computer anxiety.

==== 3. Cybergenic stress syndrome ====
It is defined by Norman as "that constellation of interrelated emotional, physiological, and behavioral signs and symptoms that accompany frustration, irritation, and hostility which, although provoked by interaction with computer hardware, software, network, and related 'help' systems, results in aggression toward people or organizations to the ultimate detriment of the person affected."

==== 4. Computer anger/rage ====
Computer anger is defined by Wilfong (2006, p. 1003) as "strong feelings of displeasure and negative cognitions in response to a perceived failure to perform a computer task." A similar term is computer rage, which is defined by Norman as "the physical bashing and verbal abuse of a computer or computer-related item." Wilfong (2006) found that computer self-efficacy beliefs had the largest significant relationship with both computer anxiety and anger. Likert-type scales can be used to measure computer anger.

== Optical health ==
Optometry & ophthalmology are the two secondary specialties.

=== Disorder categories ===
==== 1. Epilepsy ====
Digital addict can lead to flashing lights and quickly changing colours that lead to epilepsy.

==== 2. Seizure ====
Digital addict can also lead to grainy pixels with random colours in screen that lead to seizures.

==== 3. Dry eye syndrome ====
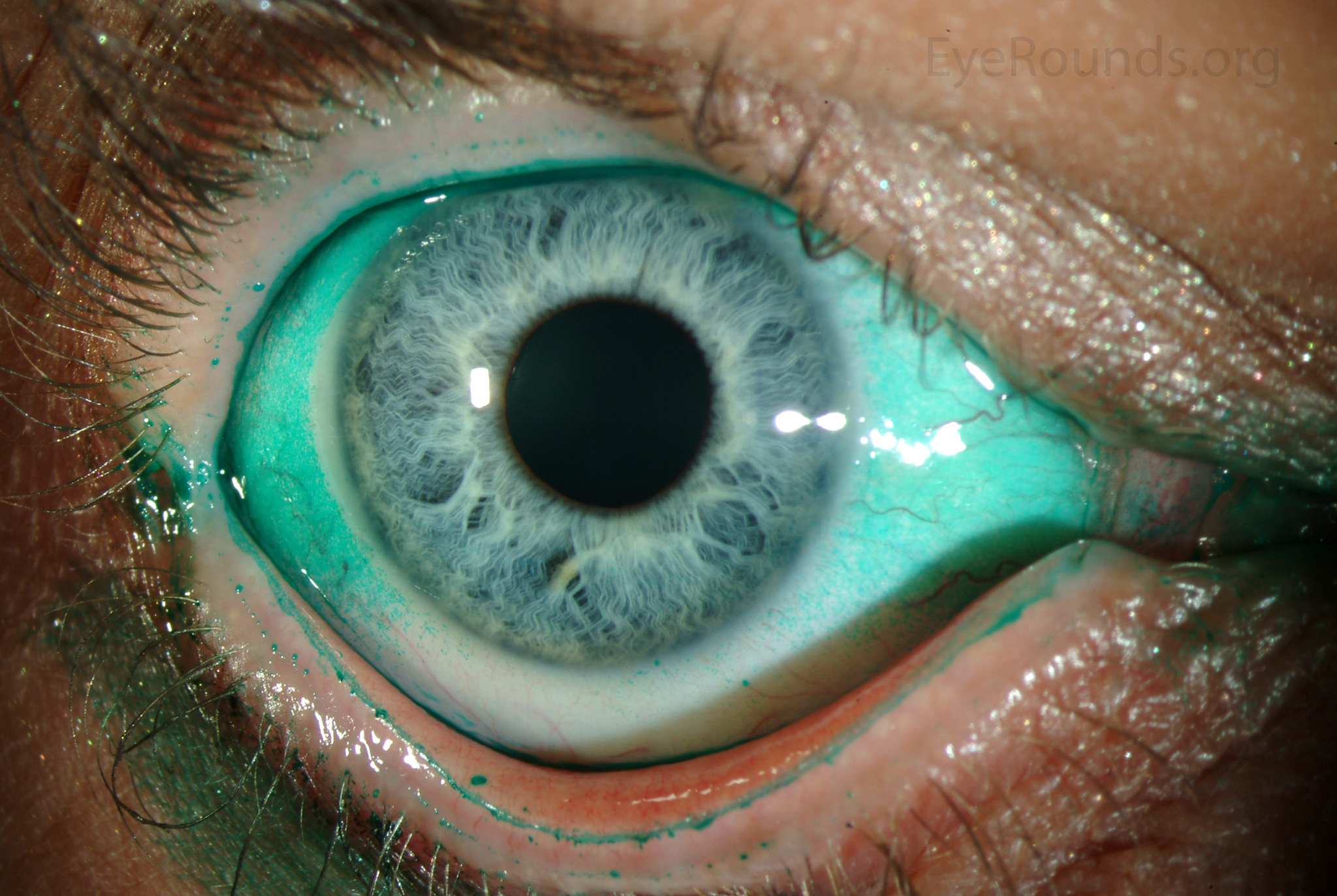
Diffuse lissamine green staining in a person with severe dry eye

Dry eye disease (DED), also known as keratoconjunctivitis sicca, is the condition of having dry eyes. The term dry eye syndrome was formerly used, but is now avoided following advances that have established it as a distinct disease entity.

Symptoms of dry eye include dryness in the eye, irritation, redness, discharge, blurred vision, and easily fatigued eyes. Symptoms range from mild and occasional to severe and continuous. DED can lead to blurred vision, instability of the tear film, increased risk of damage to the ocular surface such as scarring of the cornea, and changes in the eye including the neurosensory system.

Dry eye occurs when either the eye does not produce enough tears or when the tears evaporate too quickly. This can be caused by age, contact lens use, meibomian gland dysfunction, pregnancy, Sjögren's disease, vitamin A deficiency, omega-3 fatty acid deficiency, LASIK surgery, and certain medications such as antihistamines, some blood pressure medication, hormone replacement therapy, and antidepressants. Chronic conjunctivitis such as from tobacco smoke exposure or infection may also lead to the condition. Diagnosis is mostly based on the symptoms, though several other tests may be used. Dry eye disease occasionally makes wearing contact lenses impossible.

Treatment depends on the underlying cause. Artificial tears are usually the first line of treatment. Wrap-around glasses that fit close to the face may decrease tear evaporation. Looking carefully at the medications a person is taking and, if safe, altering the medications, may also improve symptoms if these medications are the cause. Some topical medications, or eye drops, may be suggested to help treat the condition. The immunosuppressant cyclosporine (ciclosporin) may be recommended to increase tear production and, for short-term use, topical corticosteroid medications are also sometimes helpful to reduce inflammation.

Dry eye disease is a common eye disease. It affects 5–34% of people to some degree depending on the population looked at. Among older people it affects up to 70%. In China it affects about 17% of people. The phrase "keratoconjunctivitis sicca" means "dryness of the cornea and conjunctiva" in Latin.

==== 4. The Three Twenties (20-20-20) Rule ====
The 20-20-20 rule is a simple guideline to prevent digital eye strain from prolonged screen time: Every 20 minutes, look at something 20 feet away for at least 20 seconds. This break allows the eye muscles to relax by shifting focus from a nearby screen to a distant object, which helps reduce symptoms of digital eye strain such as dryness, irritation, blurred vision, and headaches. Every 20 minutes, set a reminder or timer to take a break from your screen. If you look 20 feet away, shift your gaze to an object that is approximately 20 feet (about 6 meters) away. For 20 seconds, Hold your focus on this distant object for at least 20 seconds.

== Online help ==
Individuals with symptoms of cyberpathology could turn to a computer for psychological help. There are large amounts of mental health information available online. And the number is growing dramatically with time. However, the information varies greatly in reliability.

Psychologists also looked into the possibility of conducting psychotherapy online (e.g., Christensen, Griffiths, & Jorm, 2004, Griffiths, 2005, and Mallen, 2005).

== Offline help ==
Group therapy could be used to help individuals with symptoms of cyberpathology. Family supports are also important in helping those individuals.

== See also ==
- Behavioral addiction
- Digital addict
- Video game addiction
