= Sicca =

Sicca means dryness. It may refer to:

== Medical ==
- Sjögren syndrome, an autoimmune disorder
- Xerostomia, dryness of the mouth
- Keratoconjunctivitis sicca, also known as "dry eye syndrome"

== Places ==
- Sicca Veneria, Tunisian city from classical times
