= Manuel Casanova =

American professor

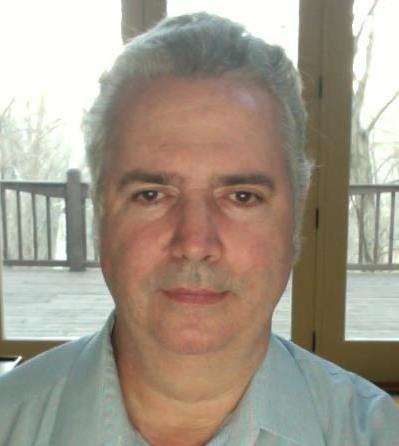
- Born: Manuel Casanova; 20 July 1953 (age 73); Hato Rey, Puerto Rico
- Education: University of Puerto Rico (BS); University of Puerto Rico School of Medicine (MD)
- Known for: SmartState Chair in Childhood neurotherapeutics
- Family: Son-in-law, Matt Might
- Awards: The Outstanding Scholar Award; Frontiers Media Spotlight Award
- Scientific career
- Fields: Childhood neurotherapeutics
- Workplaces: University of South Carolina Greenville
- Military career
- Allegiance: United States
- Branch: United States Army: United States Army Reserve
- Service years: 1984-1990
- Rank: Major
- Website: corticalchauvinism.com

Manuel F. Casanova is the SmartState Endowed Chair in Childhood Neurotherapeutics and a professor of Biomedical Sciences at the University of South Carolina School of Medicine Greenville. He is a former Gottfried and Gisela Kolb Endowed Chair in Outpatient Psychiatry and a Professor of Anatomical Sciences and Neurobiology at the University of Louisville.

Casanova was born on July 20, 1953 in the Hato Rey sector of San Juan, Puerto Rico. He is married to Emily Casanova, a research assistant professor at the University of South Carolina School of Medicine Greenville who studies autism genetics, the evolution of susceptibility genes in rare disorders, and is a patient advocate for the Ehlers-Danlos community. His son-in-law is Matt Might, director of the Hugh Kaul Personalized Medicine Institute at the University of Alabama Birmingham. Casanova has a personal blog titled "Cortical Chauvinism".

== Education and early career ==
Casanova graduated from Colegio San Ignacio de Loyola in 1970. He earned a Bachelor of Science (Chemistry) from the University of Puerto Rico and his medical degree from the University of Puerto Rico School of Medicine. He then completed clinical and research fellowships at Johns Hopkins University School of Medicine, including three years in neuropathology, where he was in-charge of pediatric neuropathology, which was when his interest in developmental disorders of the brain arose. He subsequently helped establish two brain banks, the Johns Hopkins Brain Resource Center and the Brain Bank Unit of the Clinical Brains Disorders Branch at the National Institute of Mental Health (NIMH).

Casanova spent several years as a deputy medical examiner for Washington, D.C., where he gained experience with the postmortem examination of sudden infant death syndrome and child abuse, which was when he began publishing extensively on postmortem techniques, including neuronal morphometry immunocytochemistry, neurochemistry, and autoradiography. He also worked as a consultant and was staff neuropathologist at Sinai Hospital in Maryland, the North Charles Hospital, and the D.C. General Hospital. Served from 1984 to 1990 reaching the rank of Mayor in the United States Army Reserve with the Army Medical Department Augmentation Detachment (FAAD) and the 100th Station Hospital. He is also a former lieutenant commander in the United States Public Health Service. After serving as a professor of psychiatry and neurology at the Medical College of Georgia, he subsequently joined the University of Louisville faculty. In June 2014, he moved to the University of South Carolina and the Greenville Health System.

== Research ==
Casanova's recent research projects have examined brain abnormalities in patients with neurodevelopmental disorders, including autism spectrum disorders and dyslexia. His interest has gradually come to focus on abnormalities of cortical neurocircuitry, in particular on the cell minicolumn, a vertical conglomerate of eighty to one hundred neurons that have in common a latency of response to stimulation. Using computerized imaging analysis, he has established the anatomical validity of the cell minicolumn. Casanova has reported interhemispheric differences in the morphometry of minicolumns that could provide explanations for the speciation of hominids. Localized in Brodmann area 22—part of Wernicke’s language region—the morphometric difference may play a role both in the development of language and in related disorders.

His neuromorphology research, conducted in collaboration with other researchers from around the globe, has found there are drastic differences in the brains of autistic individuals. The studies that he conducted show that minicolumns (or 'brain strands') of autism spectrum individuals have more cells, but they are narrower and more densely packed, which he says can limit the brain's ability to send messages. Casanova claimed this helps explain symptoms since "there's not enough juice to actually power very long connections in the brain".

Casanova has also been studying the autonomic nervous system in autistic individuals. He found that the sympathetic branch of the ANS is overactive in autistic children, which leads to higher levels of anxiety. Additionally, he believes that TMS and neurofeedback can reduce autonomic dysfunction that is linked to certain foods.

Casanova notes that one of the problems with brain banks is that preserved brain tissue can deteriorate over time, but claims that brain banks promote far more research insight than MRI scans.

== Recognition ==
His expertise in the field of postmortem techniques was recognized by honorary appointments as a Scientific Expert for the Armed Forces Institute of Pathology and as a Professorial Lecturer for the Department of Forensic Science at George Washington University.

== Views on neurodiversity ==
Casanova has stated that most of the neurodiversity movement is based on the good intention to destigmatize autism, but some of their scientific arguments are questionable. He sees many other positives in the movement, such as the desire for acceptance and accommodations. Casanova states that the concepts behind neurodiversity originated in ancient Greek times, when Socrates attempted to determine which behaviors were a disorder and which ones were simply differences. According to him, those ideas were also seen in the Renaissance, the Romantic era, and the antipsychiatry movement. He further claims that Leo Kanner originated the modern version of the neurodiversity movement through studying autistic individuals.

However, he says that the loudest voices in the neurodiversity camp are disruptive. Casanova claimed about their views that “They see the world in black and white, and either you are with them or against them” and “it might end up hurting research, and hurting the delivery of services to those people who most need them.” Additionally, he said “It’s not a blessing to have head-banging, eye-gouging or self-biting; those have serious side effects, including retinal detachment, cauliflower ears, they can get brain trauma, contusions. ”.

In response to neurodiversity's statement that autism does not need medical treatment, Casanova points out that parents that support therapy or treatment for autistic children say that it will reduce their suffering and give them the best chance to succeed in adulthood. Casanova additionally claimed that until recently, the neurodiversity movement wilfully neglected the roles of Leo Kanner and Bernard Rimland in advocating for accommodations, claiming that they were ignored because those individuals also wanted medical treatments for autism.

Casanova has also claimed that Neurotribes by Steve Silberman was unfairly weighted against Leo Kanner. Casanova has also written against Silberman's apparent perspective that Hans Asperger, one of the first autism researchers, should be forgiven for his involvement in the Nazi regime. "Contrary to Mr. Silberman", Casanova wrote in response, "I do not defend or condone [Asperger’s] murderous actions." He has also chosen to ignore the existence of Silberman's 2018 revision of Neurotribes, in which the author acknowledged Asperger's crimes.

Casanova claims that some media sources have misrepresented his views on autism and neurodiversity. One article from WAVE 3 claimed that Casanova wanted to wipe out autism entirely when he said that was not true. Additionally, a Newsweek article claimed that Casanova received death threats from writing about autism, but this happened because some autistic individuals falsely thought he wanted to wipe out autism based on the WAVE 3 article.
