= Henrik Sjögren =

Swedish ophthalmologist (1899–1986)

- Born: Henrik Samuel Conrad Sjögren; 23 July 1899; Köping, Sweden
- Died: 17 September 1986 (aged 87); Lund, Sweden
- Education: Karolinska Institute
- Occupation: Ophthalmologist
- Known for: Sjögren's disease

Henrik Samuel Conrad Sjögren (UK: /ˈʃɜːɡrɛn/, US: /ˈʃoʊɡrɛn/, Swedish: [ˈɧø̂ːɡreːn]; 23 July 1899, Köping – 17 September 1986, Lund) was a Swedish ophthalmologist best known for describing the eponymous condition Sjögren's disease, previously known as Sjögren syndrome. His first experience with the disease was an encounter with a 49-year-old woman with arthritis and extreme dryness of the mouth and eyes. He presented 19 similar cases for his doctoral theses in 1933 that eventually served as the basis of identifying and naming of Sjögren syndrome.

== Early life and education ==
Sjögren was born in 1899 to Anders Conrad Johansson, a merchant, and Marta Emelie Sjögren. He attended Gymnasium in Västerås before studying medicine at the Karolinska Institute, graduating in 1922. He completed qualifications as a physician in 1927. He married his classmate Maria Hellgren, the daughter of a prominent ophthalmologist, in 1928.

== Career ==
Sjögren was working as an ophthalmologist at Serafimerlasarettet in Stockholm when he encountered a 49-year-old woman with arthritis, dry mouth and dry eyes. He recognised this case as being similar to others he had seen and in 1930 he published a case series in the Swedish Medical Association's journal. By 1933, at which stage he had moved to Sabbatsberg Hospital, he had collected a total of 19 cases of what he then called "sicca syndrome", and presented these in a doctoral dissertation written in German, titled "Zur Kenntnis der Keratoconjunctivitis Sicca" (English: "On knowledge of keratoconjunctivitis sicca"). His thesis was graded poorly, restricting him from receiving the docent title or position, and he was therefore unable to pursue a career in academia.

In 1935, Sjögren was invited to establish an ophthalmology department at a hospital in Jönköping, where his wife Maria also ran a private ophthalmology practice. This made Jönköping the first country town in Sweden with an ophthalmology department. By 1936, interest in the condition he had described was growing and a Hungarian ophthalmologist proposed naming it "Sjögren syndrome". Australian ophthalmologist Bruce Hamilton contacted Sjögren in 1940 requesting permission to translate his thesis into English, which was published in 1943 and led to further international interest in the condition.

Sjögren performed the first European corneal transplantation in 1957, the same year that the University of Gothenburg awarded him the title of docent. In 1961, he was recognised by the Swedish government as a professor, a rare appointment, in recognition of his contributions to medicine.

== Later life ==
Sjögren retired from clinical work in 1967 and subsequently moved to Lund with his wife Marie. He lived in a nursing home following a stroke, where he died on 17 September 1986. Just a few months before his death, the inaugural International Symposium on Sjögren Syndrome was held in Copenhagen; he was invited to attend but instead sent a video explaining his absence due to health reasons.
