= Tear break-up time =

Time taken for the first dry spot to appear on the cornea after a complete blink

Tear break-up time (TBUT) also known as tear film break-up time (TFBUT) is the time taken for the first dry spot to appear on the cornea after a complete blink. TFBUT measurement is an easy and fast method used to assess the stability of tear film. It is a standard diagnostic procedure in the dry eye clinics. The volume of tear in the eye depends on two factors, drainage through the lacrimal passages and evaporation. Factors like decreased tear production, increased evaporation rate, tearfilm instability, tear hyperosmolarity, inflammations, ocular surface damages etc. can cause dryness to the eyes.

TBUT test was first described by Norn MS, and then revised by Lemp and Holly.

The conventional and most common TBUT measurement method is using slit lamp and sodium fluorescein. Noninvasive instruments (Oculus Keratograph 5M, Germany; K5) are used for automatic non-invasive tear breakup time (NIBUT) measurements. In non-invasive procedure, a grid or concentric ring pattern is projected onto the cornea and the patient is asked to blink. The rings will appear distorted when the cornea becomes dry. Tearscope is a commercially available instrument used to measure NIBUT.

== Clinical significance ==
Tear film break-up time is abnormal in several conditions like aqueous tear deficiency, keratoconjunctivitis sicca, mucin deficiency, and meibomian gland disorders. Evaporative dryness can also be seen in conditions like lagophthalmos, proptosis, Parkinson's disease, computer vision syndrome, contact lens use, drugs (antihistamines, beta blockers, antispasmodics, diuretics) and vitamin A deficiency, amongst others.

== Procedure ==
=== Procedure using fluorescein dye ===
- Fluorescein 2% is instilled into the lower fornix of patient's eye. Alternatively, impregnated fluorescein strip moistened with preservative (benzalkonium chloride) free saline solution can also be used.
- The eye is examined under a slit lamp with a low magnification and a broad beam covering the whole cornea. The lamp is switched to a cobalt blue filter.
- The patient is asked to blink once and to keep their eyes open.
- Due to the fluorescein, the tear film will appear green in color.
- A black spot indicating the dry area will appear a few seconds after each blink.
- TBUT is the time interval between the last blink and appearance of the first randomly-distributed dry spot.

If the patient blinks before 10 seconds have elapsed, the test must be restarted. Taking two or more measurements and calculating its average may give a greater accuracy of measurement of TBUT.

=== Non-invasive procedure ===
In a non-invasive tear breakup time measurement procedure, a grid or concentric ring pattern is projected onto the cornea and the patient is asked to blink. The rings will appear distorted when the cornea becomes dry. The time interval between the last blink and the distortion of the ring pattern gives the measurement of NIBUT.

== Normal values ==
Generally, a TBUT value of 10–35 seconds is considered normal. A value of less than 10 seconds is usually suspicious and may indicate tear film instability. Even if TBUT value is within the normal limit, if the ocular protection index is less than 1.0, dryness and discomfort can occur.

== Ocular protection index ==
Ocular protection index (OPI) is used to quantify the interaction between tear film break-up time and blink intervals of a person. It is based on the idea that, even when the TBUT is normal, if the blink interval is too slow it may cause breakage of tear film due to increased evaporation. The ocular Protection Index can be calculated by dividing tear break-up time by inter blink interval (IBI). If the inter blink interval and TBUT are same dividing both give a value of 1.0. If TBUT is more than IBI, value will be more than 1.0, so dryness will not occur. A patient is at risk of developing dry eye and if the OPI is < 1.0.

Dry eye may occur in certain environmental conditions or while performing certain visual tasks like computer use movie watching etc. Calculating ocular protection index may be useful in these conditions also. For example, If a person's TBUT is 15 seconds which is thought to be normal and his blink interval is 20 seconds, here TBUT is less than IBI, so ocular protection index will be less than 1.0 and is abnormal. Since computer use affect blink rate, OPI is a clinically relevant in detecting dryness related to computer vision syndrome.

== Contraindications ==
- Benzalkonium chloride, a preservative used in saline solution can increase tear break up speed, so it is important to choose preservative free saline solutions for moistening the flourescein strip.
- Localised corneal surface abnormalities can produce dry spots in that location and can give a falsely low break-up time. To avoid this error, repeat measurements should be taken. Appearance of dry spots in the same location in repeated procedures can indicate a surface abnormality in that area.
- Touching the cornea with flourescein strip can cause excessive tearing and will affect the TBUT.

== See also ==
- Dry eye syndrome
- Schirmer's test
- Fluorescein (medical use)
