= Alacrima =

- Specialty: Ophthalmology
- Differential diagnosis: Triple-A syndrome

Alacrima refers to an abnormality in tear production that could mean reduced tear production or absent tear production. Because a lack of tears is a feature of only a few rare disorders, it aids in diagnosis of these disorders, including Triple-A syndrome and NGLY1 deficiency.

Alacrima can be formally diagnosed through a Schirmer's test.
