= Bruce Hamilton (ophthalmologist) =

Australian ophthalmologist (1901–1968)

- Born: 2 April 1901; Hobart, Tasmania, Australia
- Died: 11 April 1968 (aged 67); Sandy Bay, Tasmania, Australia
- Education: University of Sydney (1924); Oxford University (1929)
- Spouse: Dora Jessie Grant (m. 1943)
- Medical career
- Field: Optometry
- Notable works: A Guide to Ophthalmic Operations (1940); The Significance of Heredity in Ophthalmology — A Tasmanian Survey (1951)
- Military service
- Allegiance: Australia
- Branch: Second Australian Imperial Force
- Service years: 1935–1943
- Rank: Major

John Bruce Hamilton (2 April 1901 – 11 April 1968) was an Australian ophthalmologist.

== Biography ==
Hamilton was born on 2 April 1901, in Hobart, to merchant Clyde Hamilton and Beatrice Lilian, née Paxton. He attended Leslie House School in Hobart before studying at the University of Sydney, where he received a Bachelor of Medicine in 1924. After studying ophthalmic medicine in England at the Royal College of Physicians and Oxford University (1928–29), he returned to Tasmania to set up his own practice. He was also honorary or consulting ophthalmic surgeon to the Royal Hobart Hospital, the Queen Alexandra Hospital for Women and the Royal Tasmanian Society for the Blind and Deaf. In 1937, Hamilton and Dr W. D. Counsell presented a paper on hereditary eye disease and proposed remedies to the National Health and Medical Research Council, which was awarded the Royal London Ophthalmic Hospital's Gifford Edmunds prize. In 1940 he published A Guide to Ophthalmic Operations.

Hamilton had joined the Australian Medical Corps in 1935 and was appointed a major in the Australian Imperial Force on 4 January 1941. He served in the Middle East as ophthalmic surgeon for the 2nd/7th Australian General Hospital, before returning to Australia and leaving the AIF on 1 November 1943. He married Dora Jessie Grant in Hobart on 21 April 1943. Also in 1943, he re-issued a 1933 paper by Henrik Sjögren, with his own foreword, and his own study of conjunctivitis, The Significance of Heredity in Ophthalmology — A Tasmanian Survey (1951) earned him a doctorate from the University of Sydney. He had been a fellow of the Royal Australasian College of Surgeons since 1931 and served as state chairman, and was otherwise active in the field as president of the British Medical Association's Tasmanian branch (1948), a fellow of the Royal Society of Medicine, a member of the Australian Medical Association, a life member of the Ophthalmological Society of the United Kingdom, and president of the Ophthalmological Society of Australia. He was also a member of the Liberal Party of Australia, contesting the Senate for the party in 1943 and the seat of Denison in 1946.

Hamilton, known for being a perfectionist and for having "a very real belief in himself and his abilities", died of hypertensive heart disease on 11 April 1968, aged 67 at Sandy Bay, Tasmania. He was cremated.
