= NGLY1 =

Protein-coding gene in the species Homo sapiens

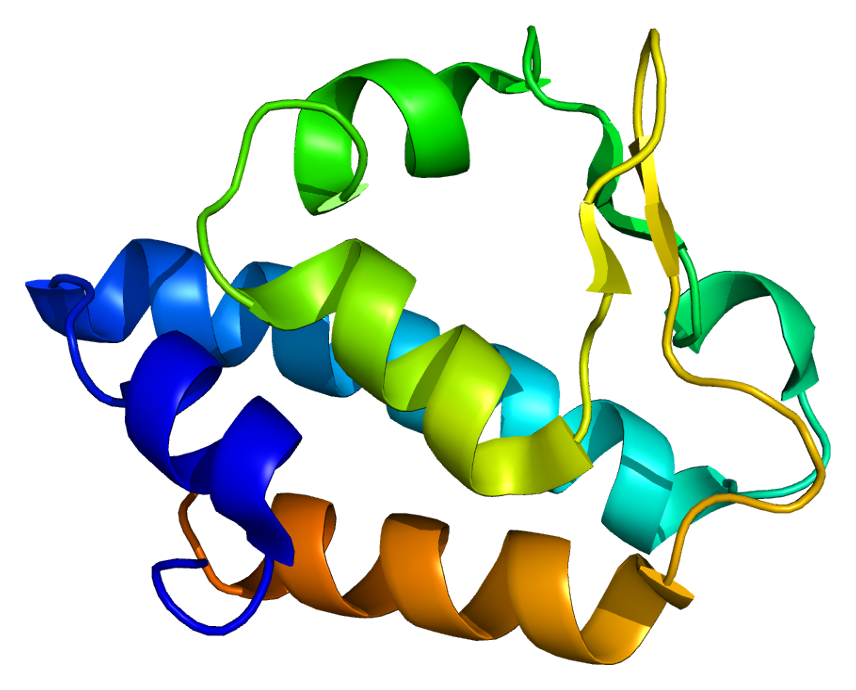

Identifiers
- Aliases: NGLY1, CDG1V, PNG1, PNGase, CDDG, N-glycanase 1, PNG-1
- External IDs: OMIM: 610661; MGI: 1913276; GeneCards: NGLY1
Available structures
PDB	Ortholog search: PDBe RCSB
PDB	List of PDB id codes 2CCQ, 2CM0
Enzyme activity
EC #	BRENDA	ExPASy	KEGG	MetaCyc
3.5.1.52	↗	↗	↗	↗

Gene location (Human)
Chr.	Chromosome 3 (human)
Band	3p24.2	Start	25,718,944 bp
Band	3p24.2	End	25,790,039 bp

Gene location (Mouse)
Chr.	Chromosome 14 (mouse)
Band	14 A1|14 7.08 cM	Start	6,157,837 bp
Band	14 A1|14 7.08 cM	End	6,220,483 bp
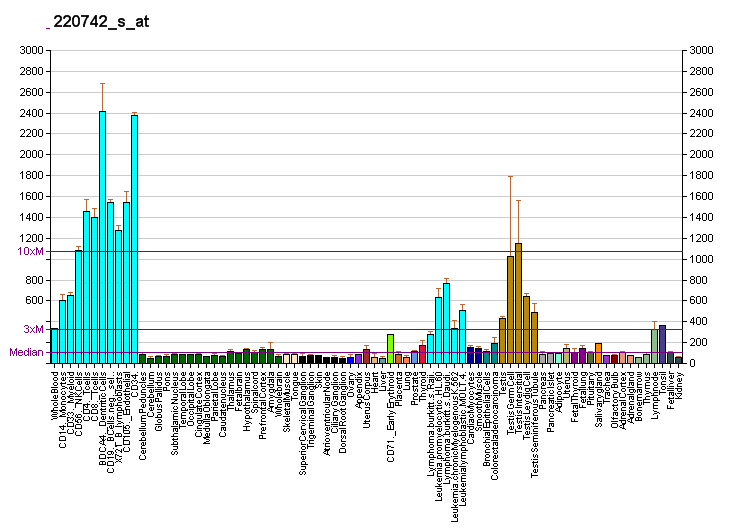
RNA expression pattern
Bgee	Human / Mouse (ortholog); Top expressed in: sperm; right testis; left testis; secondary oocyte; bone marrow cell; cartilage tissue; biceps brachii; tendon of biceps brachii; gastrocnemius muscle; glutes / Top expressed in: interventricular septum; seminiferous tubule; parotid gland; spermatid; seminal vesicula; lacrimal gland; vastus lateralis muscle; triceps brachii muscle; temporal muscle; medial head of gastrocnemius muscle; More reference expression data
BioGPS	More reference expression data
Gene ontology
Molecular function	protein binding; hydrolase activity; metal ion binding; peptide-N4-(N-acetyl-beta-glucosaminyl)asparagine amidase activity
Cellular component	cytoplasm; nucleus; cytosol
Biological process	glycoprotein catabolic process; protein quality control for misfolded or incompletely synthesized proteins; protein folding; protein deglycosylation
Sources:Amigo / QuickGO
Orthologs
Databases	NCBI: entry; OMA: entry
Species	Human	Mouse
Entrez	55768	59007
Ensembl	ENSG00000151092	ENSMUSG00000021785
UniProt	Q96IV0	Q9JI78
RefSeq (mRNA)	NM_001145293; NM_001145294; NM_001145295; NM_018297; NM_025105	NM_021504; NM_001362432; NM_001362433
RefSeq (protein)	NP_001138765; NP_001138766; NP_001138767; NP_060767	NP_067479; NP_001349361; NP_001349362
Location (UCSC)	Chr 3: 25.72 – 25.79 Mb	Chr 14: 6.16 – 6.22 Mb
PubMed search
- Wikidata
View/Edit Human	View/Edit Mouse

PNGase also known as N-glycanase 1 (EC 3.5.1.52) or peptide-N(4)-(N-acetyl-beta-glucosaminyl)asparagine amidase is an enzyme that in humans is encoded by the NGLY1 gene. PNGase is a de-N-glycosylating enzyme that removes N-linked or asparagine-linked glycans (N-glycans) from glycoproteins. More specifically, NGLY1 catalyzes the hydrolysis of the amide bond between the innermost N-acetylglucosamine (GlcNAc) and an Asn residue on an N-glycoprotein, generating a de-N-glycosylated protein, in which the N-glycoylated Asn residue is converted to asp, and a 1-amino-GlcNAc-containing free oligosaccharide. Ammonia is then spontaneously released from the 1-amino GlcNAc at physiological pH (<8), giving rise to a free oligosaccharide with an N,N’-diacetylchitobiose structure at the reducing end.

== Discovery ==
Occurrence of cytoplasmic PNGase activity in mammalian cells was first reported in cultured cells. This enzyme differ from other “reagent” PNGases from almond (glycoamidase/PNGase A), or bacteria (N-glycanase/PNGase F), that is often used for structural/functional studies of N-glycans, in several enzymatic properties, including the requirement of a reducing reagent for activity and a neutral pH for optimal activity.

The gene encoding the cytoplasmic PNGase was first identified in budding yeast, Saccharomyces cerevisiae and gene orthologues have since been found in wide variety of eukaryotes including mammals. In terms of the tissue distribution of the mouse Ngly1 gene, enzyme activities as well as transcripts were detected in all tissues/organs examined.

== Structure ==
The catalytic residues of the cytoplasmic PNGase is known to reside in a domain called transglutaminase domain. NGLY1, when compared with the yeast orthologues, possesses extended N-terminal and C-terminal sequences in addition to the transglutaminase domain. Among the additional domains found in NGLY1, the PUB (PNGase- and ubiquitin-related) domain was first identified through a bioinformatics analysis. While it was initially hypothesized that it might serve as a protein-protein interaction domain, experimental evidence supporting this hypothesis is now accumulating. On the other hand, the C-terminal PAW domain (a domain present in PNGases and other worm proteins). has now been shown to be involved in the binding of oligosaccharides to PNGase.

In terms of the crystal structures of mouse Ngly1, a catalytic core domain, a C-terminal domain including PAW domain and an N-terminal domain including PUB domain. have been obtained.

== Function ==
Regarding the function of NGLY1, it has been shown that the enzyme is involved in the ER-associated degradation (ERAD), one of the ER quality control/homeostasis systems for newly synthesized glycoproteins. The functional importance of NGLY1 in the ERAD process, however, is not clearly understood. It has also been suggested that NGLY1 is closely involved in MHC class I-mediated antigen presentation. The Ngly1-mediated (glycosylated) Asn-to-Asp deamidation constitutes, together with other reactions such as transpeptidation, unconventional post-translational modifications for antigenic peptides that are presented by MHC class I molecules.

== NGLY1-binding proteins ==
Through yeast two-hybrid screening, it has been shown that NGLY1 proteins can bind to several proteins, mostly through the N-terminal domain including the PUB domain. In vivo and in vitro interactions between NGLY1 and several ERAD-related proteins have been reported. While the importance of those protein-protein interactions to NGLY1 functions remain to be clarified, it can be assumed that such interactions may be advantageous for an efficient ERAD process.

== Clinical significance ==
In 2012, NGLY1 deficiency, involving mutations in the NGLY1 gene locus, was first identified through an exome analysis. As of now, the clinical features of 60 patients have been reported in the literature and over 100 have been identified by patient advocacy groups. One cerebral visual impairment (CVI) patient also had a mutation in NGLY1 gene. The clinical effects include neuromotor impairment, intellectual disability, and neuropathy. It has also been associated with amyotrophic lateral sclerosis and Parkinson's disease.

Details of the mechanism responsible for the pathogenesis of the NGLY1-deficiency remain unknown, while the intracellular accumulation of N-GlcNAc proteins, due to the excess action of cytosolic endo-b-N-acetylglucosaminidase to misfolded glycoproteins, in Ngly1-deficient cells has been hypothesized as a potential cause.

NGLY1 deficiency has drawn attention in the public.

Studies have been carried out to discover small molecules that can bind to the transglutaminase domain of the protein to stabilize it as a potential therapeutic in the treatment of disorder caused by NGLY1 defects.
