= Dryness (medical) =

Medical condition

Dryness is a medical condition in which there is local or more generalized decrease in normal lubrication of the skin or mucous membranes.

Examples of local dryness include dry mouth, dry eyes, dry skin (xeroderma), diabetic foot and vaginal dryness. These often have specific causes and treatments. It is possible to have dry eyes without any other signs or symptoms, but this usually causes a syndrome of eye symptoms called keratoconjunctivitis sicca.

More generalized dryness can be caused by e.g. dehydration (that is, more general loss of body fluids), anticholinergic drugs and Sjögren syndrome.
