= Sjögren's disease =

Autoimmune disease

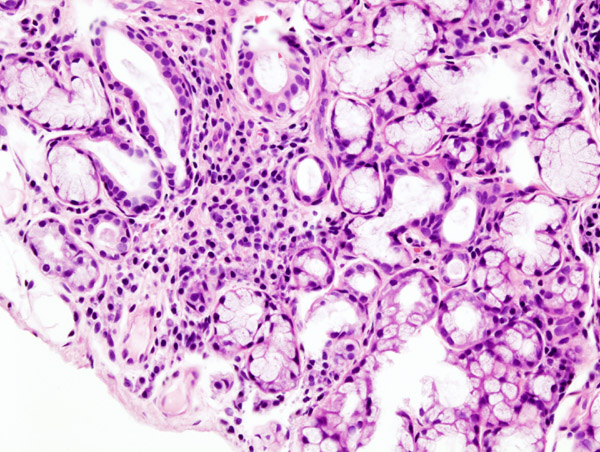
- Image with a microscope of focal lymphoid infiltration in the minor salivary gland associated with Sjögren's disease
- Pronunciation: UK: /ˈʃɜːɡrɛn/, US: /ˈʃoʊɡrɛn/ Swedish: [ˈɧø̂ːɡreːn]
- Specialty: Immunology, rheumatology
- Symptoms: Dry mouth, dry eyes, other areas of dryness, major fatigue, joint pain, brain fog
- Complications: Lymphoma, Peripheral neuropathy, Dysautonomia
- Usual onset: Middle age or earlier
- Duration: Long term
- Causes: Autoimmune disease (unknown cause)
- Diagnostic method: Tissue biopsy, blood tests
- Differential diagnosis: Medication side effect, anxiety, sarcoidosis, amyloidosis
- Treatment: Hydroxychloroquine, Artificial tears, medications to reduce inflammation
- Prognosis: Normal life expectancy
- Frequency: ~0.7%

Sjögren's disease (SjD), previously known as Sjögren syndrome or Sjögren's syndrome (SjS, SS), is a long-term autoimmune disease that primarily affects the body's exocrine glands, particularly the lacrimal and salivary glands. Common symptoms include dry mouth and dry eyes, and in a subset of patients can seriously affect other organ systems, such as the lungs, kidneys, and nervous system.

== Signs and symptoms ==
In a 2021 article on Sjögren's patients, a majority of individuals stated that eight symptoms had a major or moderate impact on their life: fatigue (79%); dry eyes (75%); dry mouth (73%); joint pain (65%); trouble sleeping (64%); eye discomfort (60%); muscle pain (56%); and brain fog (54%).

Primary symptoms are dryness (dry mouth and dry eyes), pain and fatigue. Other symptoms can include dry skin, vaginal dryness, a chronic cough, numbness in the arms and legs, feeling tired, muscle and joint pains, and thyroid problems. Those affected are also at an increased risk (5%) of lymphoma.

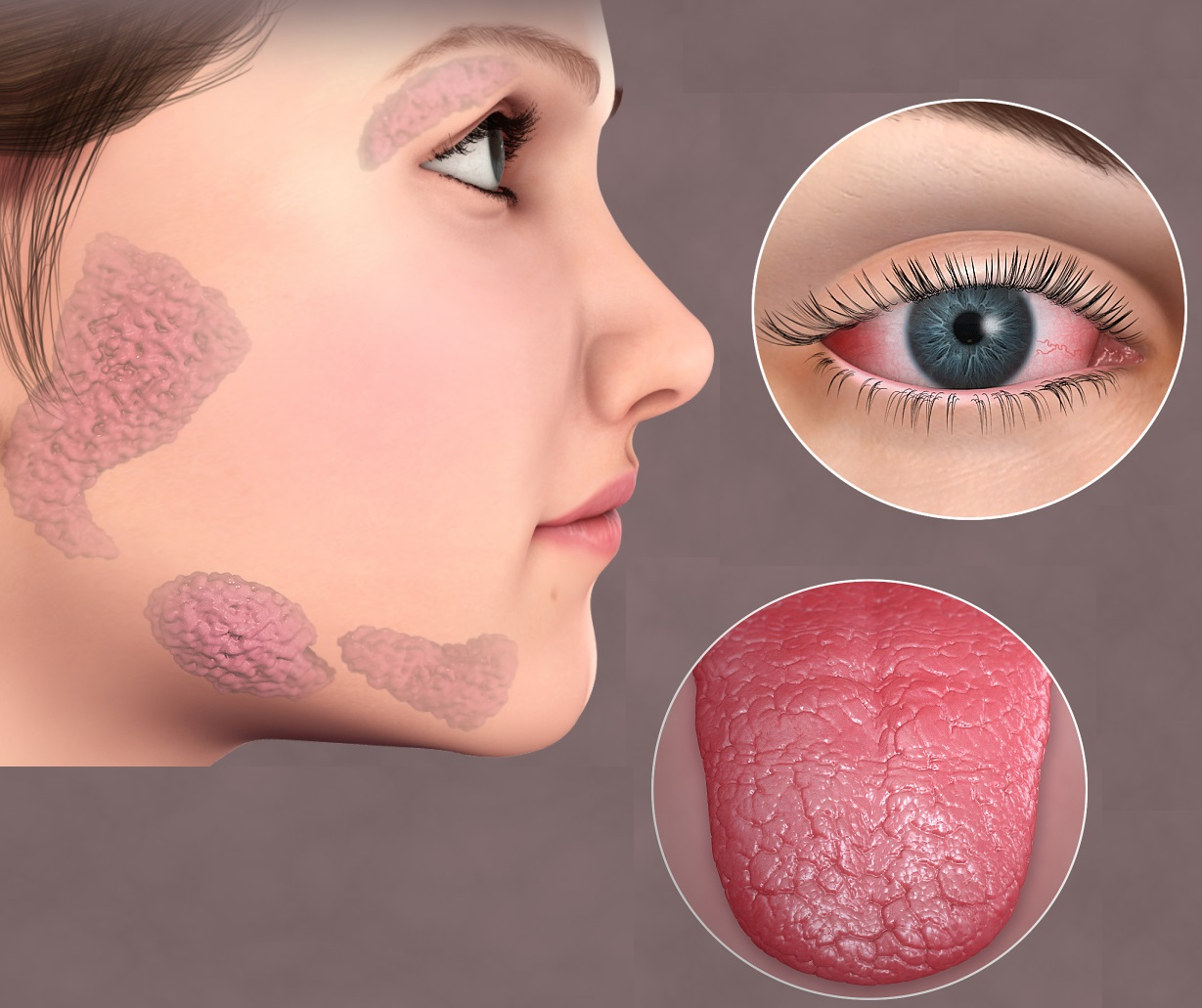
Characteristic dryness appears at a number of locations, such as the tongue, face, and eyes. Marked regions at left are the salivary glands (which may be swollen), not a facial rash.

The hallmark symptom of Sjögren's disease is dry mouth and keratoconjunctivitis sicca (dry eyes). Vaginal dryness, dry skin, and dry nose may also occur. Other organs of the body may also be affected, including the kidneys, blood vessels, lungs, liver, pancreas, and brain.

In some people with Sjögren's disease, skin dryness may be the result of lymphocytic infiltration into skin glands. The symptoms may develop insidiously, with the diagnosis often not considered for several years because sicca (dryness) may be attributed to medications, a dry environment, or aging, or may be regarded as not of a severity warranting the level of investigation necessary to establish the presence of the underlying autoimmune disorder.

Sjögren's disease can damage vital organs, with symptoms that may plateau or worsen, or go into remission, as with other autoimmune diseases. Some people may experience only the mild symptoms of dry eyes and mouth, while others have symptoms of severe disease. Many patients can treat problems symptomatically. Others experience blurred vision, constant eye discomfort, recurrent mouth infections, swollen parotid glands, dysphonia (vocal disorders including hoarseness), and difficulty in swallowing and eating. Debilitating fatigue and joint pain can seriously impair quality of life. Some patients can develop kidney involvement (autoimmune tubulointerstitial nephritis) leading to proteinuria (excess protein in urine), urinary concentrating defect, and distal renal tubular acidosis.

=== Complications ===
Among the complications discussed above, women with anti-Ro/SS-A and anti-La/SS-B antibodies who become pregnant have an increased rate of neonatal lupus erythematosus with congenital heart block requiring a pacemaker. Type I cryoglobulinemia is a known complication of Sjögren's disease.

Sjögren's disease can affect such organs as the liver, pancreas, kidneys, lungs, and central nervous system.

=== Associated conditions ===
Sjögren's disease is associated with a number of other medical conditions, many of which are autoimmune or rheumatic disorders, such as celiac disease, fibromyalgia, systemic lupus erythematosus (lupus), autoimmune thyroiditis, multiple sclerosis and spondyloarthropathy, and several malignancies, principally non-Hodgkin lymphoma.

Sjogren's is the second most common cause of dysautonomia.

== Causes ==
While the exact cause is unclear, it is believed to involve a combination of genetics and an environmental trigger such as exposure to a virus or bacterium, as is the case with many other autoimmune disorders. Around 20 autoantibodies could be involved. It can occur independently of other health problems or as a result of another connective tissue disorder. Sjögren's disease may be associated with other autoimmune diseases, including rheumatoid arthritis (RA), systemic lupus erythematosus (SLE) or systemic sclerosis. The inflammation that results progressively damages the glands. Diagnosis is by biopsy of moisture-producing glands and blood tests for specific antibodies. On biopsy there are typically lymphocytes within the glands.

=== Genetics ===
The observation of high rates of autoimmune disorders in families with a history of Sjögren's disease is linked with a genetic predisposition to the disease. Studies on the polymorphisms of human leukocyte antigen (HLA)-DR and HLA-DQ gene regions in Sjögren's patients show differential susceptibility to the disease as the result of different types of the resulting autoantibody production.

=== Hormones ===
Since Sjögren's disease has a higher prevalence in women, sex hormones, especially estrogen, are believed to affect humoral and cell-mediated immune responses, influencing susceptibility to the disease. Androgens are generally considered to prevent autoimmunity. Studies on mice models suggest estrogen deficiency stimulates presentation of autoantigens, inducing Sjögren's-like symptoms.

=== Microchimerism ===
Microchimerism of fetal cells (offspring lymphoid cells in maternal circulation) may generate autoimmunity in women who have previously been pregnant. Generation of an autoimmune potential via microchimerism may lead to a switch from a silent form of autoimmunity with age-dependent decrease in self-tolerance.

=== Environment ===
Viral proteins, engulfed molecules, or degraded self-structures may initiate autoimmunity via molecular mimicry. This may increase the chances of developing Sjögren's disease. Epstein–Barr virus, hepatitis C, and human T-cell leukemia virus-1 are among the most studied infectious agents in Sjögren's disease. To date, no direct cause-and-effect relationship has been identified between these pathogens and the development of Sjögren's disease. Damaged self-structures targeted for apoptosis may be mistakenly exposed to the immune system, triggering autoimmunity in exocrine glands, which are often prone to autoimmune responses.

== Pathogenesis ==
The pathogenetic mechanisms of Sjögren's disease have not been fully elucidated, resulting in the lack of pathophysiology knowledge of the management of this autoimmune exocrinopathy. Although the numerous factors contributing to the progression of this disease have made discovering the exact origin and cause difficult, major advances over the past decade have contributed to a proposed set of pathogenic events that occur before the diagnosis of Sjögren's disease.Sjögren's disease was originally proposed as a specific, self-perpetuating, immune system-mediated loss of exocrine glands, specifically acinar and ductal cells. Although this explains the more obvious symptoms (such as the lack of saliva and lacrimal fluid), it does not explain the more widespread systemic effects seen when the disease progresses.

In the presence of a susceptible genetic background, both environmental and hormonal factors are thought capable of triggering the infiltration of lymphocytes, specifically CD4+ T cells, B cells, and plasma cells, causing glandular dysfunction in the salivary and lacrimal glands.

Sjögren's disease is associated with increased levels in cerebrospinal fluid (CSF) of IL-1RA, an interleukin 1 antagonist. This suggests that the disease begins with increased activity in the interleukin 1 system, followed by an autoregulatory upregulation of IL-1RA to reduce the successful binding of interleukin 1 to its receptors. Interleukin 1 likely is the marker for fatigue, but increased IL-1RA is observed in the CSF and is associated with increased fatigue through cytokine-induced sickness behavior. However, Sjögren's disease is characterized by decreased levels of IL-1ra in saliva, which could be responsible for mouth inflammation and dryness. Patients with secondary Sjögren's disease also often exhibit signs and symptoms of their primary rheumatic disorders, such as systemic lupus erythematosus, rheumatoid arthritis, or systemic sclerosis.

=== Genetic predisposition ===
The genetic locus most significantly associated with Sjögren's is the major histocompatibility complex/human leukocyte antigen (MHC/HLA) region, as demonstrated by the preliminary results of the first genome-wide association study. This study included data from a discovery cohort of 395 patients of European ancestry with primary Sjögren's disease, and 1,975 healthy control individuals, and from a replication study that comprised 1,234 cases and 4,779 healthy controls. Associations with polymorphisms located at six independent loci were also detected; IRF5, STAT4, BLK, IL12A, TNIP1, and CXCR5. This also suggested the activation of the innate immune system, notably through the IFN system, B-cell activation through CXCR5-directed recruitment to lymphoid follicles and B-cell receptor (BCR) activation involving BLK, and T-cell activation owing to HLA susceptibility and the IL-12-IFN-γ-axis.

Patients of different ethnic origins carry different HLA-susceptibility alleles, of which HLA-DR and HLA-DQ are involved in the pathogenesis of Sjögren's disease. For example, patients from Northern and Western Europe and North America show a high prevalence of B8, DRw52, and DR3 genes. HLA class II alleles are associated with the presence of specific subsets of autoantibodies, rather than with the disease itself. Autoantibodies refer to the loss of B-cell tolerance leading to the production of antibodies directed against diverse organ-specific and organ-nonspecific antigens. Association between HLA and Sjögren's is restricted to patients with anti-SSA/Ro or anti-SSB/La antibodies. Seropositivity for anti-Ro and anti-La is associated with greater severity and longer duration of disease, and findings of their high abundance from the salivary glands of Sjögren's patients suggests their imperative role in the pathogenesis of Sjögren's.

Beyond genetics, epigenetic abnormality related to DNA methylation, histone acetylation, or microRNA expression probably has a key role in the pathogenesis of autoimmune diseases, including Sjögren's disease. However, research in this area is very limited.

=== Environmental triggers ===
Environmental factors, such as glandular viral infection, could prompt epithelial cells to activate the HLA-independent innate immune system through toll-like receptors. Although several infectious, exogenous agents have been implicated in the pathogenesis of Sjögren's disease, such as Epstein-Barr virus (EBV), human T-lymphotropic virus 1, and hepatitis C virus, their association with Sjögren's disease appears weak. While EBV is present in the salivary glands of normal individuals, a high incidence of EBV reactivation in Sjögren's patients has been reported with increased levels of EBV DNA. This indicates viral reactivation and the inability of lymphoid infiltrates to control EBV replication in Sjögren's disease, leading to the initiation or perpetuation of an immune response in target organs. Nonetheless, exactly how EBV reactivation is induced in lesions of patients with Sjögren's disease, and which specific molecular mechanisms are involved in the process of viral reactivation, remain to be clarified.

=== Inflammation ===
Epithelial cells in Sjögren's disease lesions are active participants in the induction and perpetuation of the inflammatory process. Environmental and hormonal factors, in concert with an appropriate genetic background, are believed to trigger Sjögren's disease, which dysregulates epithelial cells and allows aberrant homing and activation of dendritic cells (DCs), T cells, and B cells. Dendritic cells are antigen-presenting cells that process antigen material and present it to other T cells. Following the migration of lymphocytes into the glands in response to chemokines and specific adhesion molecules, T cells interact with epithelial cells. Epithelial cells are further activated by proinflammatory cytokines (IL-1β, IFN-γ, and TNF), which are produced by adjacent T cells. The early accumulation of plasmacytoid dendritic cells in the target tissues, which produce high levels of type 1 IFNs, seems important, as these cells can further dysregulate the immune response through abnormal retention of lymphocytes in the tissues, and their subsequent activation. IFN-α stimulates the production of B-cell activating factor (BAFF) by epithelial cells, DCs, and T cells. BAFF stimulates aberrant B-cell maturation, leading to the emergence of self-reactive B cells, which locally produce autoantibodies, in a germinal centre-like structure (GC-like), which is also the location of lymphomagenesis (origin of lymphoma).

=== Programmed cell death ===
Dysregulation of apoptosis (programmed cell death) is believed to play a role in the pathogenesis of a variety of autoimmune diseases, though its role in Sjögren's disease is controversial. Both the Fas and Fas ligand proteins are overexpressed in primary Sjögren's patients. Expression of BCL-1, which is known to downregulate apoptosis, was found significantly reduced in acinar and ductal epithelial cells of Sjögren's patients compared to healthy people. In situ studies did not show increased apoptosis among glandular epithelial cells but did show reduced apoptosis among infiltrating mononuclear cells. Reduced apoptosis was also implicated in the accumulation of autoreactive B-cells found in the glands. The relationship between autoantibodies expressed in Sjögren's disease and apoptosis remains an area of active research.

=== Hormonal factors ===
Sex hormones seem to influence humoral and cell-mediated immune response, with estrogen being considered one of the biggest factors responsible for sex-immunologic dimorphism. Estrogen deficiency appears to play a role in the development of Sjögren's disease. It has been hypothesized that androgen administration to the ocular surface may serve as an effective therapy for dry eyes.

== Diagnosis ==
While Sjögren's disease is one of the most common autoimmune diseases, it has no specific and non-invasive diagnostic tests.

Diagnosing Sjögren's disease is complicated by the range of symptoms that a patient may manifest, and the similarity between symptoms of Sjögren's disease and those of other conditions. Also, patients with Sjögren's symptoms approach different specialities for treatment, which can make diagnosis difficult. Since dry eyes and dry mouth are very common symptoms, and frequently occur in people over 40, affected people may believe the symptoms are age-related. Therefore, they often ignore them. Some medications can cause symptoms similar to those of Sjögren's disease.

=== Tests ===
A combination of several tests, which can be done in a series, can eventually diagnose Sjögren's disease.

==== Blood tests ====
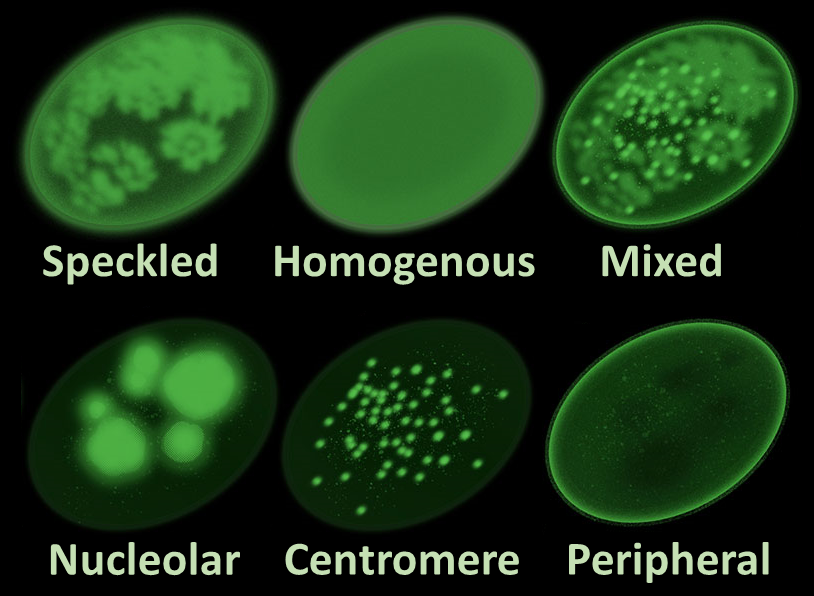
Main antinuclear antibody patterns on immunofluorescence. Individuals with Sjögren's usually have a speckled or homogeneous pattern, and rarely a centromere pattern.

Blood tests can be done to determine if a patient has high levels of antibodies that are indicative of the disease, such as antinuclear antibody (ANA) and rheumatoid factor (because Sjögren's is considered to occur frequently "secondary" to rheumatoid arthritis), which are associated with autoimmune diseases. Typical Sjögren's disease ANA patterns are SSA/Ro and SSB/La, of which anti-SSB/La is far more specific; anti-SSA/Ro is associated with numerous other autoimmune conditions, but is often present in Sjögren's disease. However, anti-SSA and anti-SSB tests are frequently not positive in Sjögren's.

==== Rose bengal test ====
The rose bengal test uses a stain that measures the state and function of the lacrimal glands. This test involves placing the nontoxic dye rose bengal on the eyes. The dye's distinctive colour helps determine the state and function of the tear film and the rate of tear evaporation. Any distinctive colour change can indicate Sjögren's disease, but confirming the condition requires many related diagnostic tools.

==== Schirmer test ====
Schirmer's test measures the production of tears: a strip of filter paper is held inside the lower eyelid for five minutes, and its wetness is then measured with a ruler. Producing less than 5 mm (0.20 in) of liquid is usually indicative of Sjögren's. This measurement analysis varies among people depending on other eye-related conditions and medications in use when the test is taken. A slit-lamp examination can reveal dryness on the surface of the eye.

Schirmer strips can be used to test oral dryness.

==== Saliva flow tests ====
Symptoms of dry mouth and dryness in the oral cavity are caused by the reduced production of saliva from the salivary glands (parotid gland, submandibular gland, and sublingual gland). In unstimulated whole saliva flow collection, the person spits into a test tube every minute for approximately 15 minutes. A resultant collection of less than 1.5 ml (0.053 imp fl oz; 0.051 US fl oz) is considered a positive result. In a stimulated saliva flow test, the person sucks on a sugar-free sweet, whilst collecting saliva. An unstimulated salivary flow rate of 0.1 to 0.2 ml/min and a stimulated flow rate of 0.7 ml/min or less is considered to be abnormally low flow rates indicative of salivary gland hypofunction.Unstimulated saliva production reduces by 40–70% between the ages of 20 and 80 years, but stimulated saliva production is not affected.

==== Lip biopsy ====
A lip/salivary gland biopsy takes a tissue sample that can reveal lymphocytes clustered around salivary glands, and damage to these glands from inflammation. This test involves removing a tissue sample from a person's inner lip/salivary gland and examining it under a microscope. On such biopsies, the single most important test result in the diagnosis of the oral component of Sjögren's is the focus score, which is the number of mononuclear cell infiltrates (containing at least 50 inflammatory cells in a 4 mm^{2} glandular section). The Chisholm-Mason grades are also widely used for salivary gland biopsies.

==== Ultrasound ====
Salivary gland ultrasonography is not invasive and may help reduce unnecessary biopsies in anti-SSA-negative patients.

==== Other tests ====
A radiological procedure known as a sialogram is available as a reliable and accurate test for Sjögren's disease. A contrast agent is injected into the parotid duct, which opens from the cheek into the vestibule of the mouth opposite the neck of the upper second molar tooth. The test is intended to detect any blockage in the salivary gland ducts (i.e., parotid duct) and the amount of saliva that flows into the mouth.

For Sjögren's disease, sudomotor function through electrochemical skin conductance may help in the diagnosis process.

=== Autoimmune comorbidity ===
People with Sjögren's may also have other autoimmune conditions.

=== Diagnostic criteria ===
An international group created a set of criteria for the diagnosis of primary Sjögren's disease in 2016 based on consensus around previous guidelines from the American College of Rheumatology (ACR) and European League Against Rheumatism (EULAR), which became known as the ACR-EULAR criteria. Although used primarily for recruitment into clinical trials, the criteria were shown to be effective in diagnosing Sjögren's by a 2025 Swedish cohort study.

Per the ACR-EULAR criteria, a person with previously reported dry eye or dry mouth symptoms (including if responding positively to a short questionnaire) has SjD if they have a score of at least 4 when considering the following items:

2016 ACR-EULAR criteria for Sjögren's disease
Item	Score
Labial salivary gland with focal lymphocytic sialadenitis and focus score ≥1	3
Positive Anti-SSA/Ro autoantibodies	3
Ocular staining score ≥5 (or van Bijsterveld score ≥4) on at least one eye	1
Positive Schirmer's test (<5 mm wetting after 5 minutes) on at least one eye	1
Unstimulated whole saliva flow rate ≤0.1 ml/min	1

Sjögren's disease may be excluded in people with past head and neck radiation therapy, active hepatitis C confirmed with a positive PCR test, acquired immunodeficiency syndrome, sarcoidosis, amyloidosis, graft-versus-host disease, and IgG4-related disease. Patients using anticholinergic drugs must stop using them for some time before being evaluated for symptoms of dryness.

== Prevention ==
No prevention mechanism exists for Sjögren's disease (SjD) because of its complexity as an autoimmune disorder. However, lifestyle changes can reduce the risk factors related to developing SjD or reduce the severity of the condition for patients who have already been diagnosed.

Diet is strongly associated with the inflammation seen in many autoimmune-related diseases, including SjD. An experimental study concluded that SjD patients often show high gluten sensitivity that directly relates to inflammation.Moderate exercise is also helpful in SjD patients, mainly reducing the effect of lung inflammation.

== Treatment ==
=== Overview ===
Treatment is directed at managing the person's symptoms. For dry eyes, artificial tears; medications to reduce inflammation; punctal plugs or other surgery to shut the tear ducts may be tried. For a dry mouth, chewing gum (preferably sugar-free); sipping water; or a saliva substitute may be used. In those with joint or muscle pain, ibuprofen may be used. Medications that can cause dryness, such as antihistamines, may also be stopped. The most specific extant diagnostic test requires a lip biopsy.

=== Treatments ===
Neither a cure nor a specific treatment for Sjögren's disease is known to restore gland secretion. Instead, treatment is generally symptomatic and supportive.

==== Eye care ====
Moisture replacement therapies such as artificial tears may ease the symptoms of dry eyes. Some patients with more severe problems use goggles to increase local humidity or have punctal plugs inserted to help retain tears on the ocular surface for a longer time.

Additionally, chronic dry eyes can be treated with prescription eyedrops that suppress the inflammation that disrupts tear secretion, such as cyclosporine (Restasis®, Cequa®, Vevye®) and lifitegrast (Xiidra®); or eyedrops that prevent tear evaporation, such as perfluorohexyloctane (Miebo®).

Prescription drugs are also available that help to stimulate salivary flow, such as cevimeline (Evoxac) and pilocarpine. Salagen, a manufactured form of pilocarpine, can be used to help produce tears, as well as saliva in the mouth and intestines. It is derived from the jaborandi plant.

==== Vaginal dryness ====
In women with Sjögren's disease, vaginal dryness, vulvodynia, and dyspareunia (painful sexual intercourse) are often reported; personal lubricants are recommended to help lessen irritation or pain that may result from dryness in the vaginal and vulval areas.

==== Musculoskeletal ====
Nonsteroidal anti-inflammatory drugs (NSAIDs) may be used to treat musculoskeletal symptoms. For individuals with severe complications, corticosteroids or immunosuppressive drugs may be prescribed, and sometimes intravenous immunoglobulins. Also, disease-modifying antirheumatic drugs, such as methotrexate, may be helpful. Hydroxychloroquine (Plaquenil) is another option and is generally considered safer than methotrexate. However, these prescribed drugs have a range of side effects such as nausea, loss of appetite, dizziness, hair loss, stomach aches/cramps, headache, liver toxicity and increased risk of infections.

==== Systemic ====
For systemic symptoms, including fatigue, joint pain, myositis, and neuropathy, biologic immunosuppressant drugs such as rituximab and belimumab that work via B-cell pathology are often used and have less toxic profiles than traditional immunosuppressive regimens.

==== Dental care ====
Preventive dental treatment is also necessary (and often overlooked by the patient), as the lack of saliva associated with xerostomia creates an ideal environment for the proliferation of bacteria that cause cavities. Treatments include at-home topical fluoride application to strengthen tooth enamel and frequent teeth cleanings by a dental hygienist. Existing cavities must also be treated, as cavities that extend into the tooth cannot be effectively treated by teeth cleaning alone, and are at a high risk of spreading into the pulp of the tooth, leading to the loss of vitality and need for extraction or root canal therapy. This treatment regimen is the same as for all xerostomia patients, such as those undergoing head and neck radiation therapy, which often damages the salivary glands; these glands are more susceptible to radiation than other body tissues.

==== Fatigue ====
Fatigue, depression, and aerobic capacity all showed a significant difference after a 12-week exercise program compared with controls, in favor of the exercise intervention. A small study showed possible efficacy of vagus nerve stimulation for Sjogren's fatigue reduction.

== Prognosis ==
=== Organ-related impacts ===
==== Non-Hodgkin lymphoma ====
Results from several studies indicate that, compared to other autoimmune diseases, Sjögren's disease is associated with a notably high incidence of non-Hodgkin lymphoma, a cancer of white blood cells. About 5% of patients with Sjögren's develop some form of lymphoid malignancy. Patients with severe cases are much more likely to develop lymphomas than patients with mild or moderate cases. The most common lymphomas are salivary extranodal marginal zone B cell lymphomas (MALT lymphomas in the salivary glands) and diffuse large B-cell lymphoma.

Lymphomagenesis in primary Sjögren's disease patients is considered a multistep process, with the first step being chronic stimulation of autoimmune B cells, especially B-cells that produce rheumatoid factor at sites targeted by the disease. This increases the frequency of oncogenic mutation, leading to any dysfunction at checkpoints of autoimmune B-cell activation to transform into malignancy. A study's findings concluded that continuous stimulation of autoimmune B cells leads to subtle germinal abnormalities in genes having specific consequences in B cells, which underlie the susceptibility to lymphoma.

==== Other organs ====
Apart from the notably higher incidence of malignant NHL, Sjögren's patients show only modest or clinically insignificant deterioration in specific organ-related function.

=== Burden of illness ===
Sjögren's disease is associated with a high burden of illness, and has been shown to markedly reduce quality of life (QoL), with a significant impact on the ability to work resulting from increased rates of disability. The reduction in QoL is similar to that seen in other chronic conditions such as rheumatoid arthritis, lupus, and fibromyalgia.

=== Mortality ===
Published studies on the survival of Sjögren's disease patients have been limited in various respects, perhaps owing to the relatively small sample sizes and the fact that secondary Sjögren's disease is associated with other autoimmune diseases. A 2010 study found a slight increase in mortality rates of Sjögren's patients compared with the remainder of the population. A 2016 study found that primary Sjögren's was not associated with an increase in all-cause mortality as compared with the general population, but that a subset of patients with extraglandular involvement, vasculitis, hypocomplementaemia, and cryoglobulinaemia may be at increased risk of mortality. A 2021 metaanalysis showed a 46% increase in mortality, with significantly greater mortality risk in patients with older age, male gender, vasculitis, interstitial lung disease, low complements, positive anti-La/SSB and cryoglobulinaemia.

Among those without other autoimmune disorders, life expectancy is unchanged.

== Epidemiology ==
Sjögren's disease (SjD) is the third-most common rheumatic autoimmune disorder, behind rheumatoid arthritis and systemic lupus erythematosus.

There are no geographical differences in the rates of Sjögren's. Sjögren's disease has been reported in all areas of the world, although regional rates have not been well studied.

Depending on the criteria to determine prevalence, studies estimate the prevalence of Sjögren's at between 500,000 and 2 million people in the United States. Broader studies of Sjögren's prevalence vary widely, with some reports suggesting a prevalence of up to 3% of the population. A few studies have reported that the incidence of the syndrome ranges between three and six per 100,000 per year. Between 0.2 and 1.2% of the population is affected, with half having the primary form and half the secondary form. It is around 10 times more common in women than in men. Though the disease commonly begins in middle age, people of any age can be affected.

Nine out of 10 Sjögren's patients are women. In addition to prevalence in women, having a first-degree relative with an autoimmune disease and previous pregnancies have been identified as epidemiological risk factors. Despite the lower risk for men, primary Sjögren's in men tends to represent a more severe form of the disease. The role of race and ethnicity in the prevalence of the disease is unknown.

Although Sjögren's disease occurs in all age groups, the average age of onset is between 40 and 60. As many as half of all cases may be left undiagnosed or unreported. The prevalence of Sjögren's generally increases with age.

Sjögren's disease is reported in 30-50% of people with rheumatoid arthritis and 10–25% with systemic lupus erythematosus.

== History ==
The disease was described in 1933 by Henrik Sjögren, after whom it is named, but several earlier descriptions of people with the symptoms exist.

Jan Mikulicz-Radecki (1850–1905) is generally credited with the first description of Sjögren's. In 1892, he described a 42-year-old man with enlargement of the parotid and lacrimal glands associated with a round-cell infiltrate and acinar atrophy. However, the criteria that Mikulicz established for diagnosis often led to misdiagnosis of Mikulicz's syndrome. Many conditions, such as tuberculosis, infections, sarcoidosis, and lymphoma, present with similar conditions to those ascribed to Mikulicz's syndrome. Nevertheless, the term "Mikulicz's syndrome" is still used occasionally to describe the appearance of lymphocytic infiltrates on salivary-gland biopsies.

In 1930, Henrik Sjögren (1899–1986), an ophthalmologist in Jönköping, Sweden, observed a patient with low secretions from the lacrimal and salivary glands. Sjögren introduced the term keratoconjunctivitis sicca for the symptom of dry eyes (keratoconjunctivitis). In 1933, he published his doctoral thesis describing 19 females, most of whom were postmenopausal and had arthritis, showing clinical and pathological manifestations of the syndrome. Sjögren clarified that keratoconjunctivitis sicca, resulting from water deficiency, had no relation to xerophthalmia, resulting from vitamin A deficiency. Sjögren's thesis was not well received as the Board of Examiners criticized some clinical aspects.

After extensive research and data collection, Sjögren published an essential paper in 1951, describing 80 patients with keratoconjunctivitis sicca, 50 of whom also had arthritis. His subsequent follow-up conference trips pertaining to his paper led to an international interest in Sjögren's syndrome. The term "keratoconjunctivitis sicca" was coined by Sjögren himself and began to be identified as Sjögren's syndrome in literature, although it can now have more general usage.

== Research ==
Research into multifactorial autoimmune diseases such as Sjögren's focuses on expanding the knowledge surrounding the disorder, improving diagnostic tools, and finding ways to prevent, manage, and cure the disorder. The United Kingdom Primary Sjögren's Syndrome Registry, a tissue biobank of samples taken for research, supported by the Medical Research Council, UK, was established in 2010. It supports clinical trials and genetic studies of Sjögren's and is open to those wishing to participate in research studies and to researchers studying the disease.

As with other autoimmune diseases, susceptibility to Sjögren's disease is greatly influenced by the human leukocyte antigen. DQA1*05:01, DQB1*02:01, and DRB1*03:01 alleles were identified as risk factors, while DQA1*02:01, DQA1*03:01 and DQB1*05:01 alleles were found to be protective factors for the disease. The relationship between alleles and specific race was also established. HLA-DQ2 and HLA-B8 are generally found in Caucasian patients. HLA-DR5 is related to Greek and Israeli patients. Multiple genome-wide association scans may be conducted in the future to identify key risk variants.

Viruses that have been associated with Sjögren's disease include human T-lymphotropic virus type 1 (HTLV-1), Epstein-Barr virus (EBV), human immunodeficiency virus (HIV), hepatitis delta virus (HDV) and hepatitis C virus (HCV).

Some research has shown that deficiencies of vitamin A and vitamin D are associated with the disease. Vitamin D deficiency was found to be related to neurological manifestations and the presence of lymphoma among patients. Vitamin A levels were inversely associated with extraglandular manifestations of the disease.

Saliva is a potential diagnostic tool for Sjögren's disease because the salivary component is changed after the onset of the disease. With the new miniaturization technology, called lab on a chip, the diagnosis can be more convenient.

Concerning therapeutics, multiple monoclonal antibodies were under investigation in 2007. The most promising seemed to be the anti-CD20 rituximab and the anti-CD22 epratuzumab, while the anti-TNF-α and IFN-α seemed less effective.

In 2014, the Sjögren's Foundation (previously the Sjögren's Syndrome Foundation) announced a five-year goal to halve the disease's average time to diagnosis.

As of 2026, several investigational therapies were in late-stage clinical development for Sjögren's disease. In January 2026, the FDA granted ianalumab Breakthrough Therapy designation for Sjögren's disease. Other agents in phase III development include telitacicept and dazodalibep.

== Society and culture ==
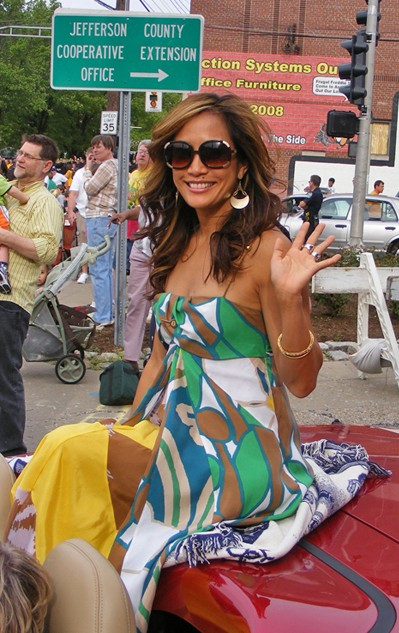
Singer-actress Carrie Ann Inaba is the US national awareness ambassador and spokesperson for the Sjögren's Foundation.

=== Notable cases ===
- Shannon Boxx (U.S. Olympic soccer player) has both Sjögren's disease and lupus.
- Carrie Ann Inaba (singer-actress) is the US national awareness ambassador and spokesperson for the Sjögren's Foundation (previously the Sjögren's Syndrome Foundation).
- Venus Williams (world champion tennis player) has been diagnosed with Sjögren's disease and said she had struggled with fatigue for years.
- Stephen McPhail (professional soccer player for Ireland, Leeds, and Cardiff City) was diagnosed with lymphoma and Sjögren's disease at age 29.
- Halsey (American singer) was diagnosed with Sjogren's, Ehlers–Danlos syndrome, mast cell activation syndrome, and postural orthostatic tachycardia syndrome.
- Slađana Milošević (Serbian singer) died after struggling with Sjögren's disease.
