= Queen Alexandra Hospital, Hobart =

Former hospital in Battery Point, Tasmania, Australia

Coordinates: 42°53′24.0″S 147°19′52.4″E

Geography
- Location: Battery Point, Hobart, Tasmania, Australia

Organisation
- Care system: Public Medicare (AU)
- Type: Specialist

Services
- Emergency department: Yes, Neonatal Intensive care
- Beds: 11
- Speciality: Maternity Hospital, Children's Hospital

History
- Founded: 1902
- Closed: 1980

Links
- Lists: Hospitals in Australia

The Queen Alexandra Hospital for Women was a maternity hospital and children's hospital established at Hobart, Tasmania in 1905 to commemorate the coronation of King Edward VII and Queen Alexandra in 1902 on a site in Hampden Road, Battery Point.

The hospital was primarily designed to care for women who were pregnant, in need of natal and neonatal care, and as a training hospital for midwives and nurses.

It was originally operated by a private board of management, but in 1950 it came under the control of the Government of Tasmania, who increasingly affiliated its services with those of the Royal Hobart Hospital. In 1980, the building in Battery Point which was becoming too antiquated for modern health care services, was closed, and the Queen Alexandra hospital was moved to a new wing attached to the Royal. In 1999, the Queen Alexandra wing was leased to a private hospital organisation, which re-opened the site as the Hobart Private Hospital.

== Notable people ==
=== Births ===
- Max Bingham (1927–2021), politician
- Martin Bryant (born 1967), perpetrated the Port Arthur massacre (Australia)
- Queen Mary of Denmark (born 1972)
- Errol Flynn (1909–1959), actor
- Peter Jones (Australian rules footballer) (born 1946)

=== Staff ===
- Bruce Hamilton (ophthalmologist) (1901–1968), ophthalmic surgeon
- Doone Kennedy (1927–2014), politician who served as a president or board member of numerous organizations, including QAH
