= Artificial tears =

Eye drops for relieving dryness and irritation in the eye

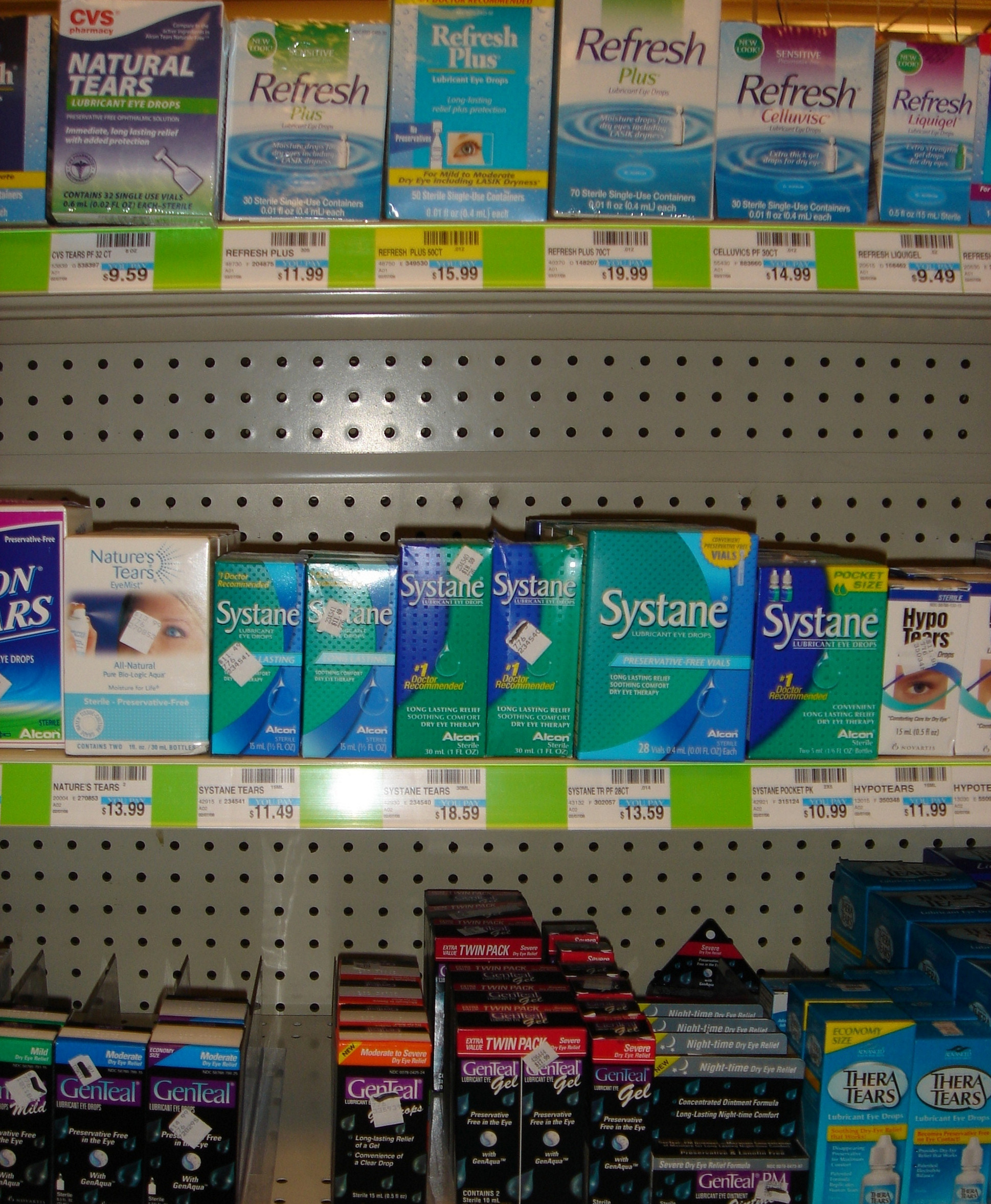
- A subset of various brands of artificial tears displayed in a store
- Specialty: Ophthalmology

Artificial tears are lubricating eye drops used to relieve dryness and irritation of the ocular surface. Dry eye syndrome (keratoconjunctivitis sicca) is a common ocular surface disorder and is characterized by disruption of the tear film and increased inflammation.

The tear film coats the surface of the eye and is composed of 3 layers: an aqueous, lipid, and mucous layer. The aqueous layer consists of a mixture of electrolytes, enzymes, antibodies, antimicrobial proteins, and other compounds. The lipid layer consists of fatty compounds that are responsible for decreasing evaporation of the tear film. The mucous layer contains mucins, gelatinous glycoproteins, which allow for an even distribution of the tear film over the corneal surface and decreased friction during blinking.

Artificial tears are used to supplement a patient's naturally-produced tears and increase eye lubrication by mimicking characteristics of the tear film. Artificial tears can be supplemented with other treatments to treat dry eye syndrome and are available over the counter. Artificial tears are also used to moisten contact lenses and in eye examinations.

== Chemistry ==
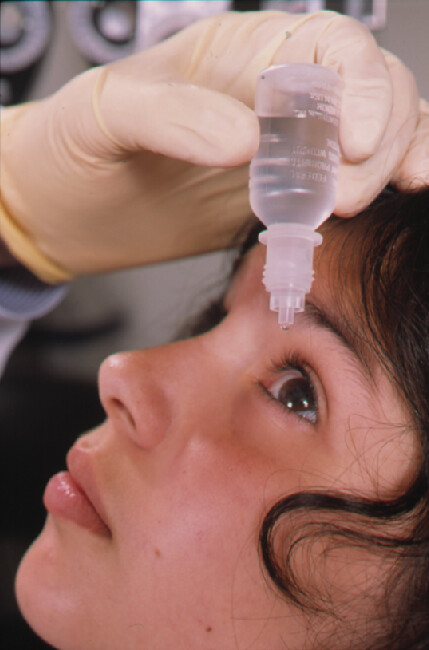
Artificial tear usage

Although artificial tears are used to mimic or supplement the roles of the tear film and contain water, electrolytes, and certain polymers, they do not contain the biologically active components found in naturally-produced tears. Moreover, artificial tears often contain chemicals that are not present in naturally-produced tears. Preparations can contain carboxymethyl cellulose, polyvinyl alcohol, hydroxypropyl methylcellulose (a.k.a. HPMC or hypromellose), hydroxypropyl cellulose and hyaluronic acid (a.k.a. hyaluronan, HA).

=== With preservatives ===
Preparations can also contain preservatives in order to prolong usage and avoid bacterial contamination. Preservatives include benzalkonium chloride (BAK), ethylenediaminetetraacetic acid (EDTA), purite, chlorobutanol, sodium perborate, thiomersal, disodium edetate, and oxychloro complex (SOC). Preservatives can be toxic and cause damage to the corneal epithelium. For instance, high concentrations of benzalkonium chloride (BAK) can cause cytotoxicity, cause cell lysis, and reduce tear and mucin production. Patients should limit their use of artificial tears with preservatives to less than four to six times a day. If artificial tears need to be utilized more than four to six times a day, a preservative-free formulation should be used.

=== Preservative-free ===
Preservative-free artificial formulations are indicated for patients who cannot tolerate artificial tear formulations with preservatives, patients who are using artificial tears more than four to six times a day, and patients who are using multiple topical eye drops with preservatives. Preservative-free eye drops are found in single vials. However, single unit-dose artificial tears without preservatives are more expensive than bottled artificial tears with preservatives.

Some patients confuse over the counter drops that contain tetrahydrozoline (e.g., Visine®), a vasoconstrictor, with artificial tears. Desensitization can occur with extended usage of drops containing tetrahydrozoline.

== Indications and effects ==
The most common indication for artificial tear use is dry eyes. Risk factors for developing dry eyes includes increasing age, female gender, environments with low moisture, nutritional deficiencies, certain medications, and autoimmune conditions. Examples autoimmune conditions are Sjogren's syndrome, autoimmune thyroid disease, and uveitis. Patients with dry eyes may have an inability to produce adequate amount or quality of tears leading to a disruption in their tear film. In addition, those who wear contact lenses or have undergone eye surgeries such as LASIK are at increased risk of having dry eyes. Normal tears are important to keep the surface of eyes clean and moist and protect eyes from infections. They are composed of many components including enzymes that act as natural antibiotics, proteins that prevent bacterial growth, and nutrients. Without adequate lubrication, patients are at risk for infection as well as irreversible scarring and damage. Artificial tears are the recognized treatment of choice for this problem.

Artificial tears work by adding similar lubricating elements that natural tears contain. This helps thicken and stabilize the pre-corneal tear film, prolonging tear film breakup time, and allowing for tears to properly protect the surface of the eyes. Most artificial tears do not require a prescription and can be used as often as needed. Patients who use artificial tears more frequently than four to six times a day should choose a brand without preservatives or one with non-irritating preservatives. Thicker artificial tears that come in the form of gel or ointments may be used in more severe cases as they last longer, although they may temporarily blur vision. In more severe cases, providers may prescribe a form of artificial tears that works to reduce inflammation in the tear glands in an effort to improve natural tear production and the quality of tears produced.

== Side effects and precautions ==
Artificial tears have no reported interactions. The most common side effect of artificial tears is temporary blurry vision. Allergic reactions have been reported and are associated with itchy or swollen eyes, dizziness, and breathing problems. These symptoms warrant discontinuation of the drops and to see a physician immediately. Prescription drops may have additional side effects such as burning, redness, pain, and a foreign body sensation.

For contact lens users, specific drops should be used to avoid ingredients that can damage the contact lens. If using multiple types of eye drops, it is important to wait a few minutes in between application of each to avoid rinsing out the prior drop. Proper technique should be conducted to avoid contaminating the bottle. Washing hands prior to use and avoiding contact between the bottle and eyes can prevent infections.

== Veterinary uses ==
Artificial tears are a part of the topical therapy for keratoconjunctivitis sicca for animals such as dogs, cats and horses. Similarly to human use, proper care should be performed to avoid contamination of the bottle. A veterinarian should be contacted if any signs of allergy, irritation, or pain develop due to the usage of artificial tears.

== Research ==
A 2016 Cochrane Review seeking to compare the effectiveness of various over the counter artificial tears in treating dry eye. While the review stated that it is unclear which artificial tear formulation works best, two trials found that 0.2% polyacrylic acid-based tears were more effective in treating dry eye symptoms over 1.4% polyvinyl alcohol-based tears.

== 2023 recall ==
On February 2, 2023, Global Pharma Healthcare issued a recall on artificial tears eye drops distributed by EzriCare and Delsam Pharma after reports of bacterial contamination. A multi-state cluster of Verona Integron-mediated Metallo-β-lactamase (VIM)- and Guiana-Extended Spectrum-β-Lactamase (GES)- producing carbapenem-resistant Pseudomonas aeruginosa (VIM-GES-CRPA) infections from the contaminated eye drops has led to reports of eye infections, permanent loss of vision, and one death.

== See also ==
- Sjögren's syndrome
