= Perfluorohexyloctane =

Medication for dry eye disease

Clinical data
- Trade names: Evotears; Miebo (/ˈmaɪboʊ/ MY-bow); Novatears
- Other names: NOV03; 1-(perfluorohexyl)octane
- AHFS/Drugs.com: Monograph
- MedlinePlus: a623054
- License data: US DailyMed: Perfluorohexyloctane
- Routes of administration: Eye drops
- ATC code: None

Legal status
- Legal status: CA: ℞-only; US: ℞-only

Identifiers
- IUPAC name: 1,1,1,2,2,3,3,4,4,5,5,6,6-tridecafluorotetradecane
- CAS Number: 133331-77-8
- PubChem CID: 10477896
- DrugBank: DB17823
- ChemSpider: 8653305
- UNII: 7VYX4ELWQM
- KEGG: D12604
- ChEBI: CHEBI:229658
- CompTox Dashboard (EPA): DTXSID20440585

Chemical and physical data
- Formula: C_{14}H_{17}F_{13}
- Molar mass: 432.269 g·mol^{−1}
- 3D model (JSmol): Interactive image
- SMILES: CCCCCCCCC(F)(F)C(F)(F)C(F)(F)C(F)(F)C(F)(F)C(F)(F)F
- InChI: InChI=1S/C14H17F13/c1-2-3-4-5-6-7-8-9(15,16)10(17,18)11(19,20)12(21,22)13(23,24)14(25,26)27/h2-8H2,1H3; Key:WRYIIOKOQSICTB-UHFFFAOYSA-N

Perfluorohexyloctane (branded as Evotears, Miebo, (Note: /ˈmaɪboʊ/ MY-bow) and Novatears, among others) is a medication used for the treatment of dry eye disease. It is a semifluorinated alkane.

Perfluorohexyloctane has been available in multiple markets since 2015 under the brand names Evotears and Novatears, and was additionally approved for medical use in the United States in May 2023 under the brand name Miebo. The US Food and Drug Administration (FDA) considers it to be a first-in-class medication.

== Medical uses ==
Perfluorohexyloctane is indicated for the treatment of the signs and symptoms of dry eye disease.

== Availability ==
Perfluorohexyloctane is sold as an over-the-counter medication under the brand names Evotears and Novatears in multiple countries, costing around NZ$34.00, A$30, and €30 for a one-month supply.

In the US, perfluorohexyloctane is sold under the brand name Miebo; a prescription is required. Perfluorohexyloctane (also under the brand name Miebo) was approved by Health Canada in September 2024.

== Side effects ==
Blurred vision and conjunctival redness are among the side effects of this drug.
