= Telitacicept =

Pharmaceutical drug

Clinical data
- Trade names: Tai'ai
- Other names: RC18
- Routes of administration: Injection

Legal status
- Legal status: Rx in China

Identifiers
- CAS Number: 2136630-26-5
- UNII: 1FHM3D7Z49

Telitacicept (trade name Tai'ai) is a pharmaceutical drug used for the treatment of systemic lupus erythematosus (SLE). It is being developed by Yantai Rongchang Pharmaceuticals and RemeGen for various autoimmune diseases. In 2021, telitacicept was approved in China for the treatment of patients with active SLE. It is also being studied for the treatment of rheumatoid arthritis (RA) and multiple sclerosis (MS).

Telitacicept is a fusion protein that combines a recombinant transmembrane activator and calcium modulator and cyclophilin ligand interactor (TACI) and a fragment of human immunoglobulin G (IgG).
