= Green S =

Chemical compound and dye

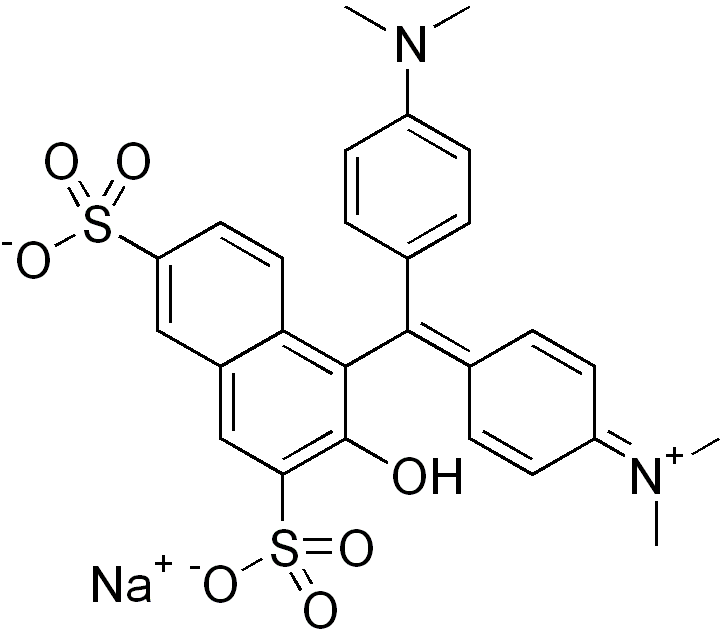

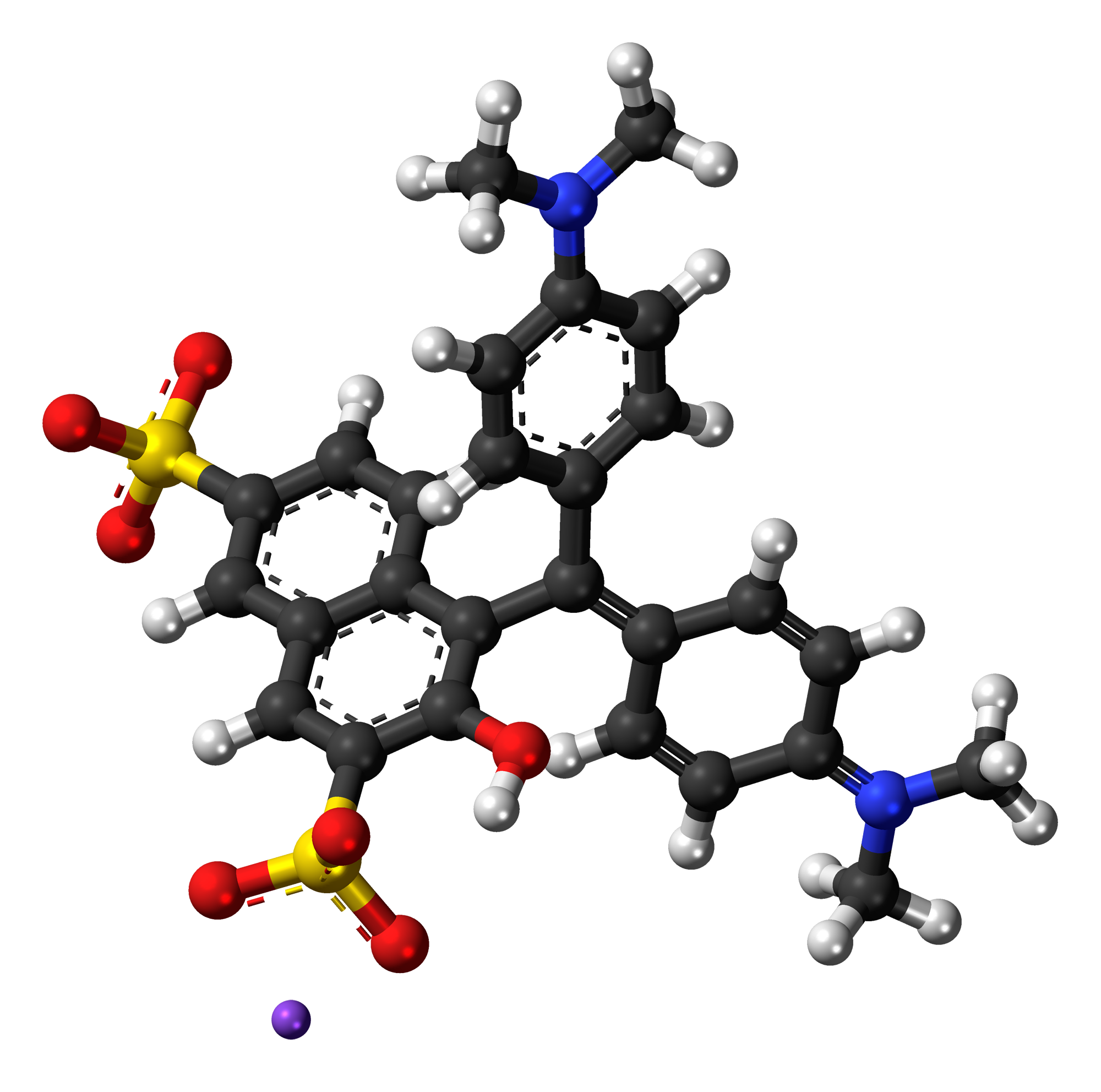

Names
- IUPAC name Sodium 4-[(4-dimethylaminophenyl)-(4-dimethylazaniumylidene-1-cyclohexa-2,5-dienylidene)methyl]-3-hydroxynaphthalene-2,7-disulfonate
- Other names: Food green S; FD&C green 4; acid green 50; lissamine green B; wool green S; C.I. 44090; E142

Identifiers
CAS Number	3087-16-9
3D model (JSmol)	Interactive image
ChemSpider	82646
ECHA InfoCard	100.019.463
E number	E142 (colours)
PubChem CID	91525
UNII	9B7E8Y9D0X
CompTox Dashboard (EPA)	DTXSID4046577
- InChI: InChI=1S/C27H26N2O7S2.Na/c1-28(2)20-9-5-17(6-10-20)25(18-7-11-21(12-8-18)29(3)4)26-23-14-13-22(37(31,32)33)15-19(23)16-24(27(26)30)38(34,35)36;/h5-16H,1-4H3,(H2,31,32,33,34,35,36);/q;+1/p-1 Key: WDPIZEKLJKBSOZ-UHFFFAOYSA-M; InChI=1/C27H26N2O7S2.Na/c1-28(2)20-9-5-17(6-10-20)25(18-7-11-21(12-8-18)29(3)4)26-23-14-13-22(37(31,32)33)15-19(23)16-24(27(26)30)38(34,35)36;/h5-16H,1-4H3,(H2,31,32,33,34,35,36);/q;+1/p-1 Key: WDPIZEKLJKBSOZ-REWHXWOFAE
- SMILES: [Na+].[O-]S(=O)(=O)c1ccc4c(c1)cc(c(O)c4/C(=C2\C=C/C(=[N+](/C)C)/C=C2)c3ccc(N(C)C)cc3)S([O-])(=O)=O

Properties
Chemical formula	C_{27}H_{25}N_{2}NaO_{7}S_{2}
Molar mass	576.62 g/mol
Melting point	210 °C (410 °F; 483 K) (decomposes)

Hazards
- GHS labelling
Pictograms	(GHS07: Exclamation mark)
Signal word	Warning
Hazard statements	H302, H315, H319, H335
Precautionary statements	P261, P305+P351+P338
- Except where otherwise noted, data are given for materials in their standard state (at 25 °C [77 °F], 100 kPa). verify (what is ?) Infobox references

Green S is a green synthetic coal tar triarylmethane dye with the molecular formula C_{27}H_{25}N_{2}O_{7}S_{2}Na.

As a food dye, it has E number E142. It can be used in mint sauce, desserts, gravy granules, sweets, ice creams, and tinned peas. Green S is prohibited as a food additive in Canada, United States, Japan, and Norway. It is approved for use as a food additive in the EU, UK and Australia and New Zealand.

Green S is a vital dye, meaning it can be used to stain living cells. It is used in ophthalmology, along with fluorescein and rose bengal, to diagnose various disorders of the eye's surface, dry eyes for example.
