= Schirmer's test =

Medical test to assess tear production

- Schirmer's test, placing the strip in the lower eyelid pouch
- Purpose: assess tear production

Schirmer's test determines whether the eye produces enough tears to keep it moist. This test is used when a person experiences very dry eyes or excessive watering of the eyes. It can cause damage to the cornea. A negative (more than 10 mm of moisture on the Schirmer strip in 5 minutes) test result is normal. Both eyes normally secrete the same amount of tears.

== History ==
The test is named after Otto Schirmer. Historically, the strips have been manufactured from various materials, including blotting paper, litmus paper, and cigarette paper. Whatman standard No. 41 filter paper and Black Ribbon No. 589 were later recommended as standardized materials. Manufacturers generally do not specify the exact origins of the materials they use, even though these papers are still commonly employed. As a result, Schirmer strips available on the market can differ visibly, even under simple inspection. Such inconsistencies may alter test performance and potentially influence clinical interpretation.

== Test procedure ==
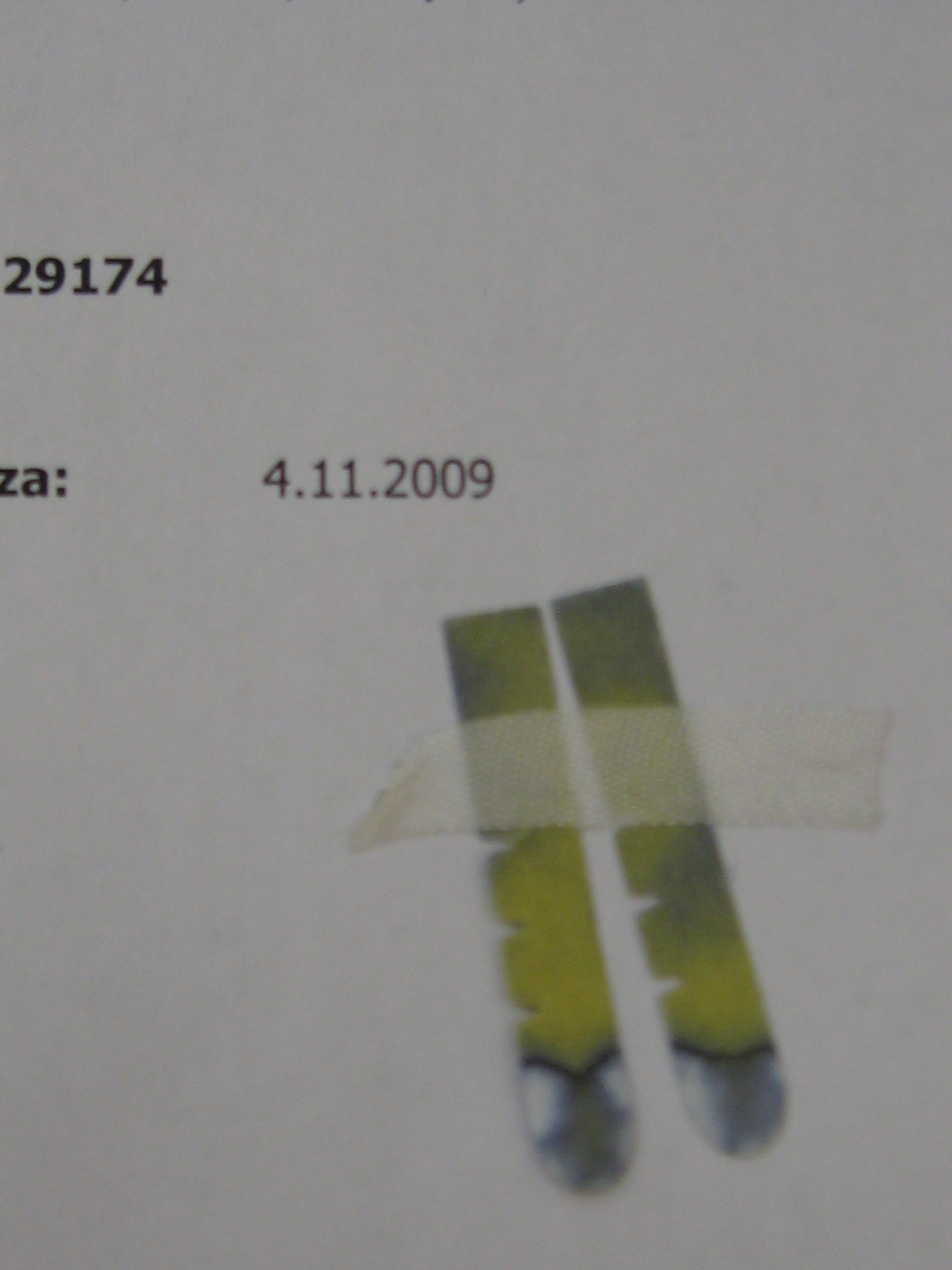
Schirmer test = 0,00 in Sjögren's syndrome

The test works by the principle of capillary action, which allows the water in tears to travel along the length of a paper test strip in an identical fashion as a horizontal capillary tube. The rate of travel along the test strip is proportional to the rate of tear production. The patient is instructed to look upward, and the patient's eyelid is pulled down. The bent end of the test strip is placed in the eye such that it rests between the palpebral conjunctiva of the lower eyelid and the bulbar conjunctiva of the eye. Schirmer's test uses paper strips inserted into the eye for several minutes to measure the production of tears. Both eyes are tested at the same time. Most often, this test consists of placing a small strip of filter paper inside the lower eyelid (inferior fornix).

The eyes are closed for approximately 5 minutes. The paper is then removed and the amount of moisture is measured. After five minutes, the patient is asked to open both eyes and look upward so the test strips may be removed. The Schirmer test score is determined by the length of the moistened area of the strips (using the scale packaged with the strips) The use of the anesthetic ensures that only basal tear secretion is being measured.

A young person normally moistens 15 mm of each paper strip. Because hypolacrimation occurs with aging, 33% of normal elderly persons may wet only 10 mm in 5 minutes. Persons with Sjögren's disease moisten less than 5 mm in 5 minutes.

How to read results of the Schirmer's test:

1. Normal which is ≥10 mm wetting of the paper after 5 minutes.
2. Tear deficiency which is <5 mm wetting of the paper after 5 minutes.

Notably, the closed-eye method is generally preferred over open-eye testing, as it accounts for variables such as humidity, temperature, tear evaporation, brightness, and tear-stimulating effects from the lid margin and eyelashes. Maintaining the eyes softly closed, rather than tightly shut, further reduces discomfort. Gaze position has also been shown to affect Schirmer test results, with higher values recorded when the test is performed with an inferior gaze. Additionally, diurnal variations can influence visual function and ocular surface physiology in individuals with dry eye.

== Benefits and limitations ==
The Schirmer test is one of the three primary diagnostic assessments recommended by the Tear Film and Ocular Surface Society's Dry Eye Workshop II (TFOS DEWS II) report. Cut-off values for diagnosing dry eye are variable, ranging from ≤10 mm over 5 minutes (TFOS DEWS II) to 5–15 mm, depending on disease severity and testing methodology. The test has been shown to be a robust predictor of dry eye disease severity, irrespective of the cut-off level used (5, 10, or 15 mm).

This test is straightforward, accessible, low-cost, and broadly adopted. However, it has several limitations, including low reproducibility, limited sensitivity and specificity, a relatively long testing time (~5 minutes), the risk of evaporative loss, high variability, patient discomfort, uneven tear absorption by the strip, and no clearly defined cut-off value. Despite these drawbacks, the Schirmer test is accepted as an effective tool for assessing dry eye, particularly in severe cases. In addition to their diagnostic use, Schirmer strips have been increasingly utilized for tear sampling, especially for analyzing proteins and metabolites. Some pre-analytical and analytical factors influencing tear metabolomics using Schirmer strips in dry eye disease have been addressed previously. Moreover, a workflow for tear proteome analysis has been established to facilitate biomarker discovery.

== Alternatives ==
With respect to its limitations, newer and improved tests of tear production and function are emerging.

- One test measures an iron-binding molecule called lactoferrin. The amount of this molecule appears to be closely related to tear production. Patients with low tear production and dry eyes have low levels of this molecule. This test may be especially valuable for patients with dry eyes since it can point to specific treatment strategies for dry eye.
- The tears may also be examined for their content of lysozyme, an enzyme normally found in tears.
- Another test involves fluorescein eye drops, which contain a dye that is placed in the eye. The dye should drain with the tears through the lacrimal duct into the nose within 2 minutes. If patients do not have enough tears to flush the dye into the nose, this time will be longer. A new test is also available to more accurately measure the flow of dye out of the eye.

== Eye dryness ==
Dry eyes can occur from conditions such as:

- Aging
- Arthritis
- Corneal ulcers and infections
- Diabetes
- Eye infections (for example conjunctivitis)
- Secondary tearing deficiency associated with disorders such as – lymphoma, leukemia, GVHD (graft vs. host disease, after a transplant)
- Sjögren's disease
- Triple A syndrome
- Vitamin A deficiency
- As a temporary or permanent side effect of LASER vision correction surgery such as LASIK or photorefractive keratectomy (PRK)

The inability of tears to drain into the nose can occur with:

- Some eye infections
- Blockage of the tear duct

== See also ==
- Dry eye syndrome
- Tear break-up time
