= Matt Might =

- Education: Georgia Tech
- Known for: Precision medicine
- Children: 3
- Scientific career
- Fields: Precision medicine
- Workplaces: University of Utah; University of Alabama Birmingham
- Website: matt.might.net

Matthew Might (born 24 July 1981) is a computer scientist, biologist, educator, and public health administrator. Might serves as the director of the Hugh Kaul Precision Medicine Institute at the University of Alabama Birmingham.

== Education and career ==
Might received his bachelor's degree in 2001 and PhD in 2007 from Georgia Tech, both in computer science. In 2008, he joined the faculty at the University of Utah, where he worked as a professor of computer science and pharmaceutical chemistry until 2017, when he moved to Birmingham, Alabama. He was a visiting professor of biomedical informatics at Harvard Medical School.

Might is a White House strategist for the Precision Medicine Initiative, and is an advisor for the Undiagnosed Diseases Network. In 2017, he was given a Rare Impact Award by the National Organization for Rare Disorders. Might is the Chief Scientific Officer of the NGLY1 Foundation.

== Research ==
Might's early work focused on cybersecurity. In recent years, he has transitioned to personalized medicine and bioinformatics.

Might wrote a blog post that went viral after his son, Bertrand, was diagnosed with NGLY1 deficiency, a rare disease that was previously unknown. This widespread publicity allowed him to locate several other patients and generate data on the characteristics of the disease.

Might used an artificial intelligence system he was developing called mediKanren to find out that Bertrand had Pseudomonas, during a time when he was in critical condition.

== Personal life ==
Might has three children. His eldest child, Bertrand, died in 2020. His father was the president and CEO of Cable One, the cable-television division of the former Washington Post Company.
