= Eye disease =

Health condition negatively affecting the eye

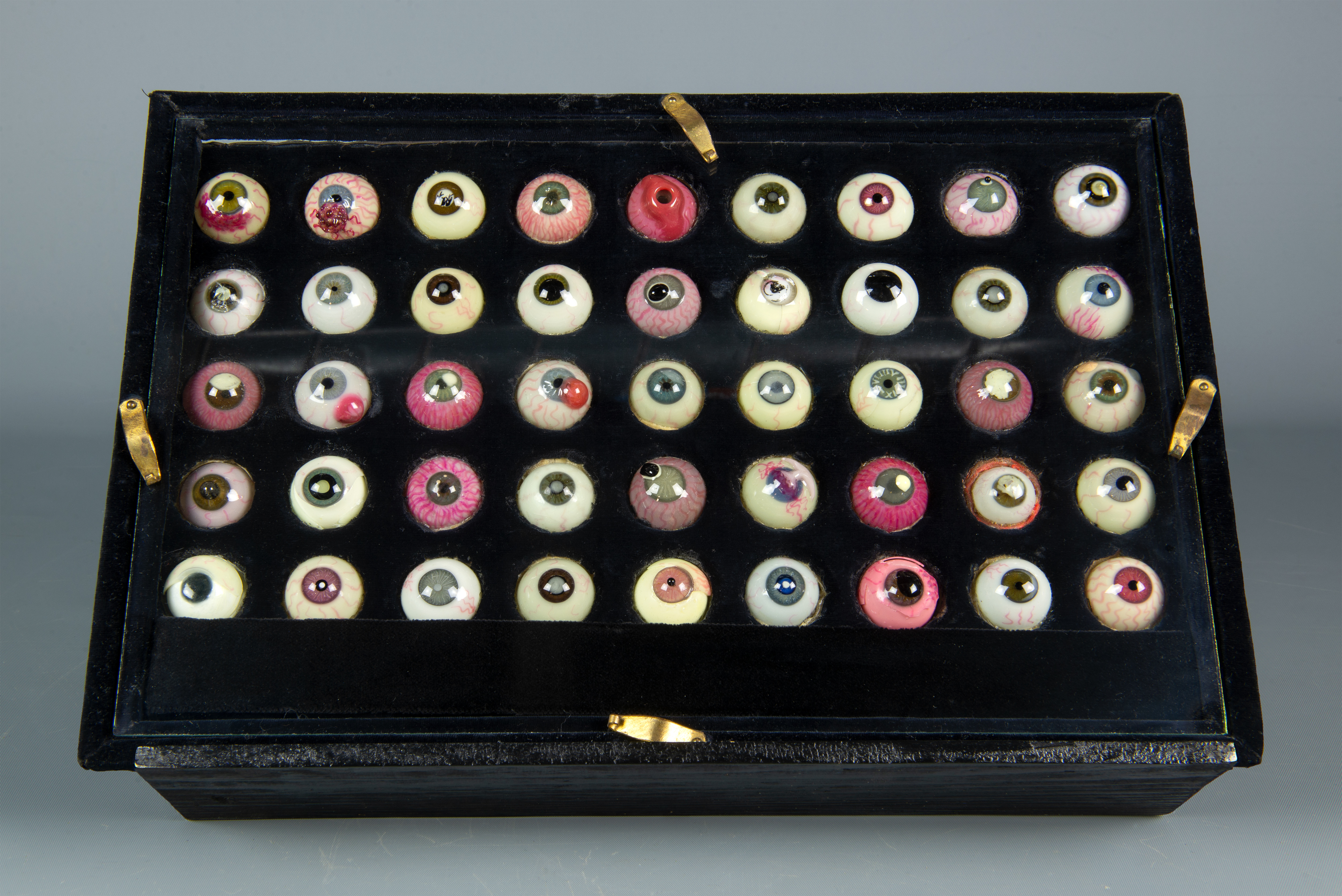
Box containing forty-five glass eyeballs representing a variety of eye pathologies (Sorbonne University).

This is a partial list of human eye diseases and disorders.

The World Health Organization (WHO) publishes a classification of known diseases and injuries, the International Statistical Classification of Diseases and Related Health Problems, or ICD-10. This list uses that classification.

== H00–H06 Disorders of eyelid, lacrimal system and orbit ==
- (H02.1) Ectropion
- (H02.2) Lagophthalmos
- (H02.3) Blepharochalasis
- (H02.4) Ptosis
- (H02.5) Stye, an acne type infection of the sebaceous glands on or near the eyelid.
- (H02.6) Xanthelasma of eyelid
- (H03.0*) Parasitic infestation of eyelid in diseases classified elsewhere
  - Dermatitis of eyelid due to Demodex species ( B88.0+ )
  - Parasitic infestation of eyelid in:
    - leishmaniasis ( B55.–+ )
    - loiasis ( B74.3+ )
    - onchocerciasis ( B73+ )
    - phthiriasis ( B85.3+ )
- (H03.1*) Involvement of eyelid in other infectious diseases classified elsewhere
  - Involvement of eyelid in:
    - herpesviral (herpes simplex) infection ( B00.5+ )
    - leprosy ( A30.-+ )
    - molluscum contagiosum ( B08.1+ )
    - tuberculosis ( A18.4+ )
    - yaws ( A66.-+ )
    - zoster ( B02.3+ )
- (H03.8*) Involvement of eyelid in other diseases classified elsewhere
  - Involvement of eyelid in impetigo ( L01.0+ )
- (H04.0) Dacryoadenitis
- (H04.2) Epiphora
- (H06.2*) Dysthyroid exophthalmos it is shown that if your eye comes out that it will shrink because the optic fluids drain out

== H10–H13 Disorders of conjunctiva ==
- (H10.0) Conjunctivitis – inflammation of the conjunctiva commonly due to an infection or an allergic reaction
- (H11.129) Conjunctival concretion – development of hard deposits under the eyelid

== H15–H22 Disorders of sclera, cornea, iris and ciliary body ==
- (H15.0) Scleritis – a painful inflammation of the sclera
- (H16) Keratitis – inflammation of the cornea
- (H16.0) Corneal ulcer / Corneal abrasion – loss of the surface epithelial layer of the eye's cornea
- (H16.1) Snow blindness / Arc eye – a painful condition caused by exposure of unprotected eyes to bright light
- (H16.1) Thygeson's superficial punctate keratopathy
- (H16.4) Corneal neovascularization
- (H18.5) Fuchs' dystrophy – cloudy morning vision
- (H18.6) Keratoconus – degenerative disease: the cornea thins and changes shape to be more like a cone than a parabole
- (H19.3) Keratoconjunctivitis sicca – dry eyes
- (H20.0) Iritis – inflammation of the iris
- (H20.0, H44.1) Uveitis – inflammatory process involving the interior of the eye; Sympathetic ophthalmia is a subset.

== H25–H28 Disorders of lens ==
- (H25) Cataract – the lens becomes opaque
- (H26) Myopia – close object appears clearly, but far ones do not
- (H27) Hypermetropia – Nearby objects appears blurry
- (H28) Presbyopia – inability to focus on nearby objects

== H30–H36 Disorders of choroid and retina ==
=== H30 Chorioretinal inflammation ===
(H30) Chorioretinal inflammation

- (H30.0) Focal chorioretinal inflammation
  - Focal:
    - chorioretinitis
    - choroiditis
    - retinitis
    - retinochoroiditis
- (H30.1) Disseminated chorioretinal inflammation
  - Disseminated:
    - chorioretinitis
    - choroiditis
    - retinitis
    - retinochoroiditis

- Excludes: exudative retinopathy (H35.0)

- (H30.2) Posterior cyclitis
  - Pars planitis
- (H30.8) Other chorioretinal inflammations
  - Harada's disease
- (H30.9) Chorioretinal inflammation, unspecified
  - Chorioretinitis
  - Choroiditis
  - Retinitis
  - Retinochoroiditis

=== H31 Other disorders of choroid ===
(H31) Other disorders of choroid

- (H31.0) Chorioretinal scars
  - Macula scars of posterior pole (postinflammatory) (post-traumatic)
  - Solar retinopathy
- (H31.1) Choroidal degeneration
  - Atrophy
  - Sclerosis
    - Excludes: angioid streaks (H35.3)
- (H31.2) Hereditary choroidal dystrophy
  - Choroideremia
  - Dystrophy, choroidal (central areolar) (generalized) (peripapillary)
  - Gyrate atrophy, choroid
    - Excludes: ornithinaemia ( E72.4 )
- (H31.3) Choroidal haemorrhage and rupture
  - Choroidal haemorrhage:
    - NOS (Not Otherwise Specified)
    - expulsive
- (H31.4) Choroidal detachment
- (H31.8) Other specified disorders of choroid
- (H31.9) Disorder of choroid, unspecified

=== H32 Chorioretinal disorders in diseases classified elsewhere ===
(H32) Chorioretinal disorders in diseases classified elsewhere

- (H32.0) Chorioretinal inflammation in infectious and parasitic diseases classified elsewhere
  - Chorioretinitis:
    - syphilitic, late ( A52.7+ )
    - toxoplasma ( B58.0+ )
    - tuberculosis ( A18.5+ )
- (H32.8) Other chorioretinal disorders in diseases classified elsewhere

=== H33 Retinal detachments and breaks ===
- (H33) Retinal detachment with retinal break
  - Rhegmatogenous retinal detachment
- (H33.1) Retinoschisis and retinal cysts — the retina separates into several layers and may detach
  - Cyst of ora serrata
  - Parasitic cyst of retina NOS
  - Pseudocyst of retina
    - Excludes: congenital retinoschisis (Q14.1)
      - microcystoid degeneration of retina (H35.4)
- (H33.2) Serous retinal detachment
  - Retinal detachment:
    - NOS
    - without retinal break
      - Excludes: central serous chorioretinopathy (H35.7)
- (H33.3) Retinal breaks without detachment
  - Horseshoe tear of retina, without detachment
  - Round hole of retina, without detachment
  - Operculum
  - Retinal break NOS
    - Excludes: chorioretinal scars after surgery for detachment (H59.8)
    - peripheral retinal degeneration without break (H35.4)
- (H33.4) Traction detachment of retina
  - Proliferative vitreo-retinopathy with retinal detachment
- (H33.5) Other retinal detachments

=== H34 Retinal vascular occlusions ===
A retinal vessel occlusion is a blockage in the blood vessel at the back of your eye that can result in sight loss.

=== H35 Other retinal disorders ===
- (H35.0) Hypertensive retinopathy – burst blood vessels, due to long-term high blood pressure
  - (H35.0/E10-E14) Diabetic retinopathy – damage to the retina caused by complications of diabetes mellitus, which could eventually lead to blindness
- (H35.0-H35.2) Retinopathy – general term referring to non-inflammatory damage to the retina
- (H35.1) Retinopathy of prematurity – scarring and retinal detachment in premature babies
- (H35.3) Age-related macular degeneration – the photosensitive cells in the macula malfunction and over time cease to work
- (H35.3) Macular degeneration – loss of central vision, due to macular degeneration
  - Bull's Eye Maculopathy
- (H35.3) Epiretinal membrane – a transparent layer forms and tightens over the retina
- (H35.4) Peripheral retinal degeneration
- (H35.5) Hereditary retinal dystrophy
- (H35.5) Retinitis pigmentosa – genetic disorder; tunnel vision preceded by night-blindness
- (H35.6) Retinal haemorrhage
- (H35.7) Separation of retinal layers
  - Central serous retinopathy
  - Retinal detachment: Detachment of retinal pigment epithelium
- (H35.8) Other specified retinal disorders
- (H35.81) Macular edema – distorted central vision, due to a swollen macula
- (H35.9) Retinal disorder, unspecified

=== H36 Retinal disorders in diseases classified elsewhere ===
- (H36.0) Diabetic retinopathy

== H40–H42 Glaucoma ==
  - (H40.1) Primary open-angle glaucoma
  - (H40.2) Primary angle-closure glaucoma
  - (H40.3) Primary Normal tension glaucoma

== H43–H45 Disorders of vitreous body and globe ==
=== H43 Disorders of vitreous body ===
- (H43.0) Vitreous prolapse
  - Excludes: vitreous syndrome following cataract surgery (H59.0)
- (H43.1) Vitreous haemorrhage
- (H43.2) Crystalline deposits in vitreous body
- (H43.3) Other vitreous opacities
  - Vitreous membranes and strands
- (H43.8) Other disorders of vitreous body
  - Vitreous:
    - degeneration
    - detachment
    - Excludes: proliferative vitreo-retinopathy with retinal detachment (H33.4)
- (H43.9) Disorder of vitreous body, unspecified

=== H44 Disorders of globe ===
Includes: disorders affecting multiple structures of eye

- (H44.0) Purulent endophthalmitis
  - Panophthalmitis
  - Vitreous abscess
- (H44.1) Other endophthalmitis
  - Parasitic endophthalmitis NOS
  - Sympathetic uveitis
- (H44.2) Degenerative myopia
- (H44.3) Other degenerative disorders of globe
  - Chalcosis
  - Siderosis of eye
- (H44.4) Hypotony of eye
- (H44.5) Degenerated conditions of globe
  - Absolute glaucoma
  - Atrophy of globe
  - Phthisis bulbi
- (H44.6) Retained (old) intraocular foreign body, magnetic
  - Retained (old) magnetic foreign body (in):
    - anterior chamber
    - ciliary body
    - iris
    - lens
    - posterior wall of globe
    - vitreous body
- (H44.7) Retained (old) intraocular foreign body, nonmagnetic
  - Retained (nonmagnetic)(old) foreign body (in):
    - anterior chamber
    - ciliary body
    - iris
    - lens
    - posterior wall of globe
    - vitreous body
- (H44.8) Other disorders of globe
  - Haemophthalmos
  - Luxation of globe
- (H44.9) Disorder of globe, unspecified

=== H45 Disorders of vitreous body and globe in diseases classified elsewhere ===
- (H45.0) Vitreous haemorrhage in diseases classified elsewhere
- (H45.1) Endophthalmitis in diseases classified elsewhere
  - Endophthalmitis in:
    - cysticercosis
    - onchocerciasis
    - toxocariasis
- (H45.8) Other disorders of vitreous body and globe in diseases classified elsewhere

== H46–H48 Disorders of optic nerve and visual pathways ==
- (H47.2) Leber's hereditary optic neuropathy – genetic disorder; loss of central vision,.
- (H47.3) Optic disc drusen – globules progressively calcify in the optic disc, compressing the vascularization and optic nerve fibers

== H49–H52 Disorders of ocular muscles, binocular movement, accommodation and refraction ==
- (H49-H50) Strabismus (Crossed eye/Wandering eye/Walleye) – the eyes do not point in the same direction
  - (H49.3-4) Ophthalmoparesis – the partial or total paralysis of the eye muscles
  - (H49.4) Progressive external ophthalmoplegia – weakness of the external eye muscles
  - (H50.0, H50.3) Esotropia – the tendency for eyes to become cross-eyed
  - (H50.1, H50.3) Exotropia – the tendency for eyes to look outward
- H52 Disorders of refraction and accommodation
  - (H52.0) Hypermetropia (Farsightedness) – the inability to focus on near objects (and in extreme cases, any objects)
  - (H52.1) Myopia (Nearsightedness) – distant objects appear blurred
  - (H52.2) Astigmatism – the cornea or the lens of the eye is not perfectly spherical, resulting in different focal points in different planes
  - (H52.3) Anisometropia – the lenses of the two eyes have different focal lengths
  - (H52.4) Presbyopia – a condition that occurs with growing age and results in the inability to focus on close objects
  - (H52.5) Disorders of accommodation
    - Internal ophthalmoplegia

== H53–H54.9 Visual disturbances and blindness ==
- (H53.0) Amblyopia (lazy eye) – poor or blurry vision due to either no transmission or poor transmission of the visual image to the brain
- (H53.0) Leber's congenital amaurosis – genetic disorder; appears at birth, characterised by sluggish or no pupillary responses
- (H53.1, H53.4) Scotoma (blind spot) – an area impairment of vision surrounded by a field of relatively well-preserved vision. See also Anopsia.
- (H53.5) Color blindness – the inability to perceive differences between some or all colors that other people can distinguish
  - (H53.5) Achromatopsia / Maskun – a low cone count or lack of function in cone cells
- (H53.6) Nyctalopia (Night blindness) – a condition making it difficult or impossible to see in the dark
- (H54) Blindness – the brain does not receive optical information, through various causes
  - (H54/B73) River blindness – blindness caused by long-term infection by a parasitic worm (rare in western societies)
  - (H54.9) Micropthalmia/coloboma – a disconnection between the optic nerve and the brain and/or spinal cord

== H55–H59 Other disorders of eye and adnexa ==
- (H57.9) Red eye – conjunctiva appears red typically due to illness or injury
- (H58.0) Argyll Robertson pupil – small, unequal, irregularly shaped pupils

== Other codes ==
The following are not classified as diseases of the eye and adnexa (H00–H59) by the World Health Organization:

- (B36.1) Keratomycosis – fungal infection of the cornea
- (E50.6–E50.7) Xerophthalmia – dry eyes, caused by vitamin A deficiency
- (Q13.1) Aniridia – a rare congenital eye condition leading to underdevelopment or even absence of the iris of the eye

== See also ==
- Endophthalmitis
- Corneal dystrophy
- Corrective lenses
- Fungal contamination of contact lenses
- Lists of diseases
- List of eye surgeries
- List of systemic diseases with ocular manifestations
- Ophthalmology

== Notes ==
Please see the References section below for the complete listing of information.
