= Herpes zoster ophthalmicus =

Shingles in the human eye

- Other names: Ophthalmic zoster
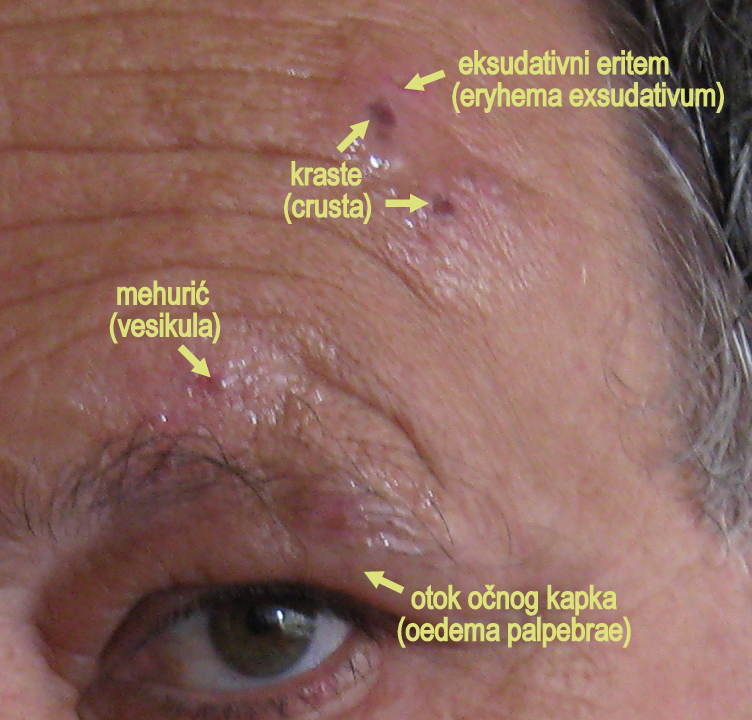
- Herpes zoster ophthalmicus
- Specialty: Ophthalmology
- Symptoms: Rash of the forehead, swelling of the eyelid, pain and red eye
- Complications: visual impairment, increased pressure within the eye, chronic pain, stroke
- Causes: Reactivation of varicella zoster virus
- Risk factors: Poor immune function, psychological stress, older age
- Diagnostic method: Based on symptoms
- Prevention: Herpes zoster vaccine
- Medication: Antiviral pills such as acyclovir, steroid eye drops
- Frequency: Up to 125,000 per year (US)

Herpes zoster ophthalmicus (HZO), also known as ophthalmic zoster, is shingles involving the eye or the surrounding area. Common signs include a rash of the forehead with swelling of the eyelid. There may also be eye pain and redness, inflammation of the conjunctiva, cornea or uvea, and sensitivity to light. Fever and tingling of the skin and allodynia near the eye may precede the rash. Complications may include visual impairment, increased pressure within the eye, chronic pain, and stroke.

The underlying mechanism involves a reactivation of the latent varicella zoster virus (VZV) within the trigeminal ganglion supplying the ophthalmic nerve (the first division of the trigeminal nerve). Diagnosis is generally based on signs and symptoms. Alternatively, fluid collected from the rash may be analyzed for VZV DNA using real-time PCR. This test is rapid, easy to perform, and is highly sensitive and specific method for diagnosing this condition.

Treatment is generally with antiviral pills such as acyclovir. Steroid eye drops and drops to dilate the pupil may also be used. The herpes zoster vaccine is recommended for prevention in those over the age of 50. HZO is the second most common manifestation of shingles, the first being involvement of skin of the thorax. Shingles affects up to one half million people in the United States per year, of which 10% to 25% is HZO.

== Signs and symptoms ==
=== Skin ===
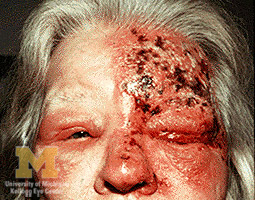
Trigeminal shingles with uveitis and keratitis

- Viral prodrome
- Preherpetic neuralgia
- Rash, transitioning from papules to vesicles to pustules to scabs.
- Hutchinson's sign: cutaneous involvement of the tip of the nose, indicating nasociliary nerve involvement. While a positive Hutchinson's sign increases the likelihood of ocular complications associated with HZO, its absence does not rule out ophthalmic involvement.
- Disseminated distribution in individuals with immunodeficiency.

=== Cornea ===
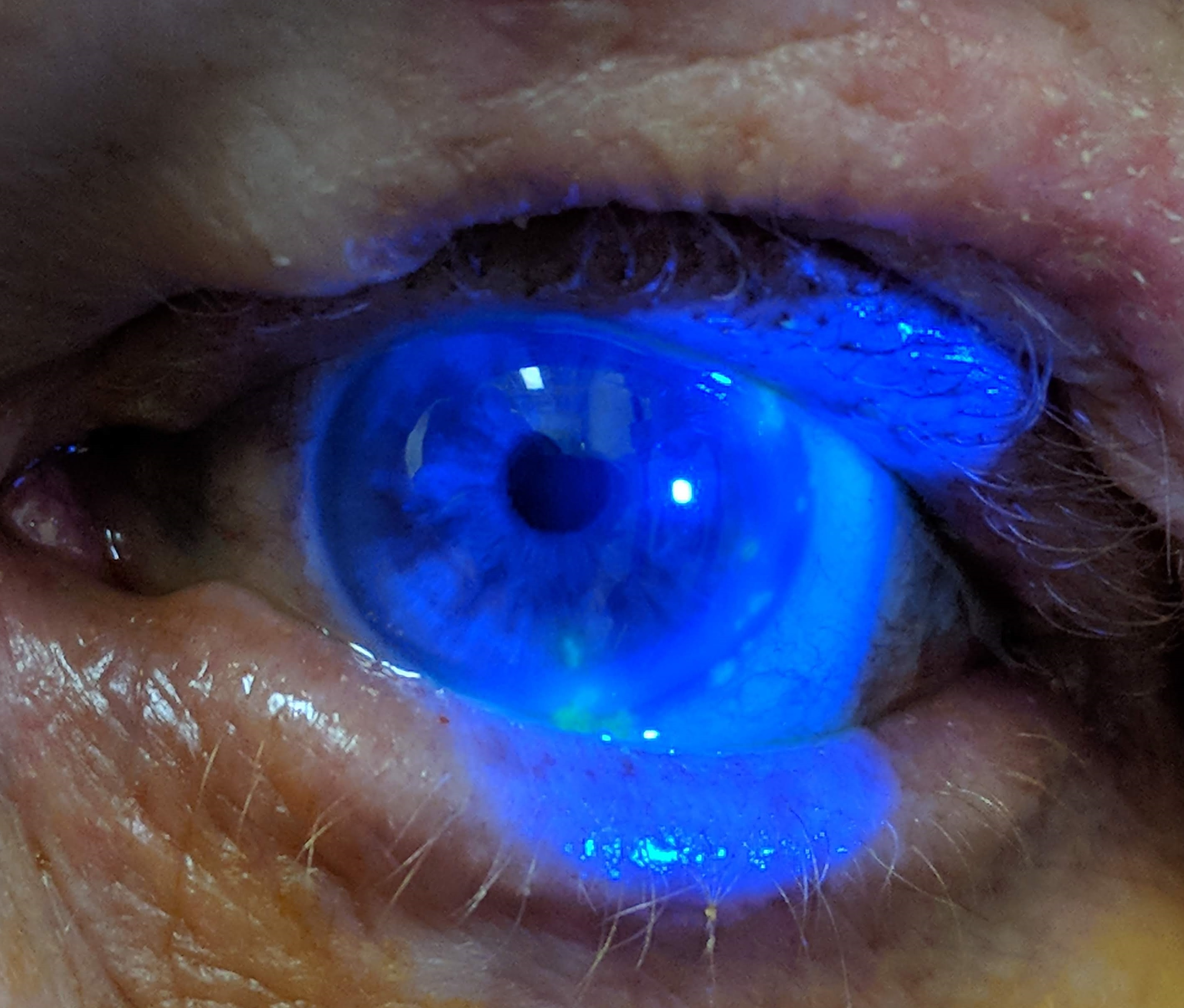
Herpes zoster ophthalmicus as seen after fluorescence staining using cobalt blue light

- Epithelial: punctate epithelial erosions and pseudodendrites: often have anterior stromal infiltrates. Onset 2 to 3 days after the onset of the rash, resolving within 2–3 weeks. Common.
- Stromal:
  - Nummular keratitis: have anterior stromal granular deposits. Occurs within 10 days of onset of rash. Uncommon
  - Necrotising interstitial keratitis: Characterised by stromal infiltrates, corneal thinning and possibly perforation. Occurs between 3 months and several years after the onset of rash. Rare.
- Disciform Keratitis (Disciform Endotheliitis): a disc of corneal oedema, folds in Descemet's membrane, mild inflammation evident within the anterior chamber and fine keratic precipitates. Chronic. Occurs between 3 months and several years after the onset of the rash. Uncommon.
- Neurotrophic: corneal nerve damage causes a persistent epithelial defect, thinning and even perforation. The cornea becomes susceptible to bacterial and fungal keratitis. Chronic. Late onset. Uncommon.
- Mucous plaques: linear grey elevations loosely adherent to the underlying diseased epithelium/stroma. Chronic. Onset between 3 months and several years after the onset of the rash.

=== Uveal ===
Anterior uveitis develops in 40–50% of people with HZO within 2 weeks of the onset of the skin rashes. Typical HZO keratitis at least mild iritis, especially if Hutchinson's sign is positive for the presence of vesicles upon the tip of the nose.

Features:

This non-granulomatous iridocyclitis is associated with:

- Small keratic precipitates
- Mild aqueous flare
- Occasionally haemorrhagic hypopyon

HZO uveitis is associated with complications such as iris atrophy and secondary glaucoma are not uncommon. Complicated cataract may develop in the late stages of the disease.

== Causes ==
Herpes Zoster or shingles is caused by the reactivation of latent human herpesvirus type 3 (Varicella Zoster virus), typically many years/decades later. A person can have this virus hidden away within their neurosensory ganglia after being infected initially (chickenpox) during childhood. In summary, chickenpox is caused by the infection of VZV virus. However, HZO is specifically the reactivation of the latent virus within the first branch of the trigeminal nerve, called the ophthalmic branch of cranial nerve V.

=== Risk Factors ===
Immunosuppression is the biggest factor for the reactivation of VZV and the development of herpes zoster. This can occur through acquired infection of HIV or through malignancy. Other risk factors besides immunosuppression that have been shown to have an increased risk of herpes zoster are family history, physical trauma, and increased age. Other less significant risk factors include female gender, psychological stress, and the presence of a variety of comorbidities like diabetes, rheumatoid arthritis, cardiovascular disease, renal disease, lupus, and inflammatory bowel disease.

== Mechanism ==
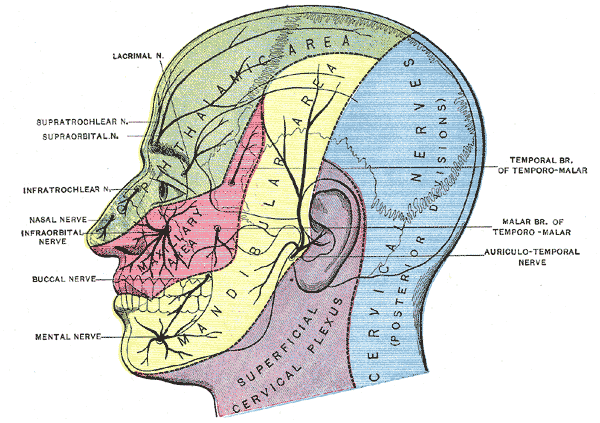
General distribution of the three divisions of the trigeminal nerve: ophthalmic, maxillary, and mandibular.

In the course of primary infection, which is normally acquired through respiratory droplets that invade the upper respiratory tract of the host. Viral particles are believed to migrate retrograde from the site of skin infection along sensory neurons, eventually reaching the dorsal root ganglia. Once the primary infection is contained by the host immune system, the virus can enter a prolonged dormant state, most commonly in the spinal root or cranial nerve ganglia. Reactivation of HZ leads to clinical manifestations localized within the dermatome, or specific area of the human body, associated with the affected nerve.

HZO is due to reactivation of VZV within the trigeminal ganglion, and the skin lesions that arise are usually limited to one side of the face. HZO more commonly erupts in the ophthalmic division of the trigeminal nerve compare to the other two divisions. HZO follows the distribution of one or more branches of the ophthalmic divisions of the trigeminal nerve, typically the supraorbital nerve, the supratrochlear nerve, and the nasociliary nerve. Involvement of the nasociliary branch, which supplies the globe is associated with a higher risk of ocular complications.

Viral replication leads to peripheral spread along sensory nerves and a localized inflammatory response, which manifests itself as pain with burning or tingling. When the virus reaches the skin, pustular lesions will develop. Involvement of the long ciliary nerves in HZO leads to potential inflammation of ocular structures like the cornea, sclera, conjunctiva, iris, retina, and optic nerve.

== Diagnosis ==
The diagnosis of HZO is done based on clinical presentation since the classic eruption of painful vesicles in the ophthalmic nerve distribution has been reported as being able to be confirmed serologically in up to 91% of cases. Therefore, the history and physical are important parts of making a diagnosis of HZO, as laboratorial testing is often not necessary. The evaluation of a patient with suspected HZO should include a comprehensive ophthalmic examination consisting of external inspection, assessment of visual acuity, slit-lamp examination with fluorescein and rose bengal staining, and evaluation of the posterior segment. If laboratory testing is needed, a sample from the skin lesions can be examined under a microscope using a Tzanck smear or Wright stain to look for signs of HZ infection. The diagnosis can also be confirmed with viral culture, immunofluorescence testing, or polymerase chain reaction (PCR), which looks for viral genetic material.

Of note, a prominent sign that has been well studied is (Hutchinson's sign): If the rash involves the tip of the nose, this likely indicates viral infectious involvement of the nasociliary branch. Therefore, it is likely there will be ocular involvement and symptoms.

Although, the painful vesicular eruption in the ophthalmic division is classic for HZO, there are other important diagnoses to consider especially when not all three symptoms (vesicular rash, pain, ocular involvement) are present.

Differential Diagnosis
Orbital pain without vesicular rash	Tension headache	Migraine	Cluster headache	Giant cell arteritis
Asymptomatic vesicular rash	Contact dermatitis	Impetigo	Herpes Simplex Virus (HSV) infection	
Ocular involvement without rash	Preseptal cellulitis	Corneal abrasion	Infectious keratitis	Uveitis

Differentiating HSV from HZO may be difficult as both cause painful vesicular rashes, however, HSV is more likely to occur in multiple dermatomes, whereas HZO usually shows up in just one specific region of the body. Moreover, patients with a rash that is bilateral or on both sides of the face is less likely to be HZO.

== Prevention ==
Primary prevention of HZO is acquiring protection against primary infection with VZV. As a result, more than 90 percent of people not vaccinated against VZV will be infected in adolescence and become susceptible to developing HZO in the future. Two vaccines have been developed to prevent HZ in adults. The first is a live-attenuated vaccine called zoster vaccine live (ZVL, Zostavax, Merck & Co.), was approved in 2006. Subsequently, a newer vaccine called the recombinant zoster vaccine (RZV, Shingrix, GSK), was approved in 2017. After the U.S. Food and Drug Administration approved the RZV, the Advisory Committee on Immunization Practices (ACIP) recommended that all adults aged 50 or older receive the RZV, even if they had previously received the ZVL. The recombinant vaccine, RZV, is preferred over the live vaccine, ZVL, because evidence shows that it provides stronger and more lasting protection against HZ. According to one retrospective cohort study, the RZV (shingrix) vaccine decreased incidence of HZ as well as HZO. The incidence in the vaccinated group was 11.9 cases vs 72.1 cases per 100,000 person-years in the unvaccinated group, showing a significant reduction. More recently, the ACIP has recommended RZV for adults aged 19 years and older who are immunocompromised or immunosuppressed.

== Treatment ==
The main goals of treatment for herpes zoster, and HZO, are to reduce the severity and duration of symptoms, since the natural disease course will eventually resolve. However, treatment can help with the severity and duration as well as promote healing of skins lesions, and improve quality of life.

Treatment is usually with antivirals such as acyclovir, valacyclovir, or famcyclovir by mouth. There is uncertainty as to the difference in effect between these three antivirals. Antiviral eye drops have not been found to be useful. These medications work best if started within 3 days of the start of the rash. Starting antiviral therapy as early as possible helps slow disease progression and reduces the risk of complications. In people with widespread infection or weakened immune systems, intravenous (IV) acyclovir is recommended, and IV foscarnet may be used if the virus is resistant to acyclovir. Along with antiviral and pain-relieving medications, doctors may sometimes prescribe corticosteroids to reduce inflammation. However, the use of topical or oral corticosteroids remains controversial because the benefits must be weighed against the potential risks, and the evidence of effectiveness is limited.

Cycloplegics, which are eye drop medications that cause pupil dilation, prevent synechiae, which are adhesions between eye structures, from forming.

== Epidemiology ==
The annual incidence of Herpes Zoster is about 3.2 cases per 1000 people in the U.S., with a marked increase in its frequency starting above the age of 60 and reaching the height of its incidence at age 90, about 9 cases per 1000 people. Specifically, HZO occurs in about 10% of the estimated 1 million annual herpes zoster cases, with an incidence of 30.9 cases per 100,000 persons, according to one population based cohort study in the U.S. The incidence of HZ has been rising even after the introduction of the chickenpox vaccine. Looking more closely, in persons younger than 21 and older than 60, the incidence of HZ and HZO has declined since 2007. However the rates have increased in the subgroup of those aged 31–60, resulting in the overall increase of incidence.
