= Nummular keratitis =

Feature of viral keratoconjunctivitis

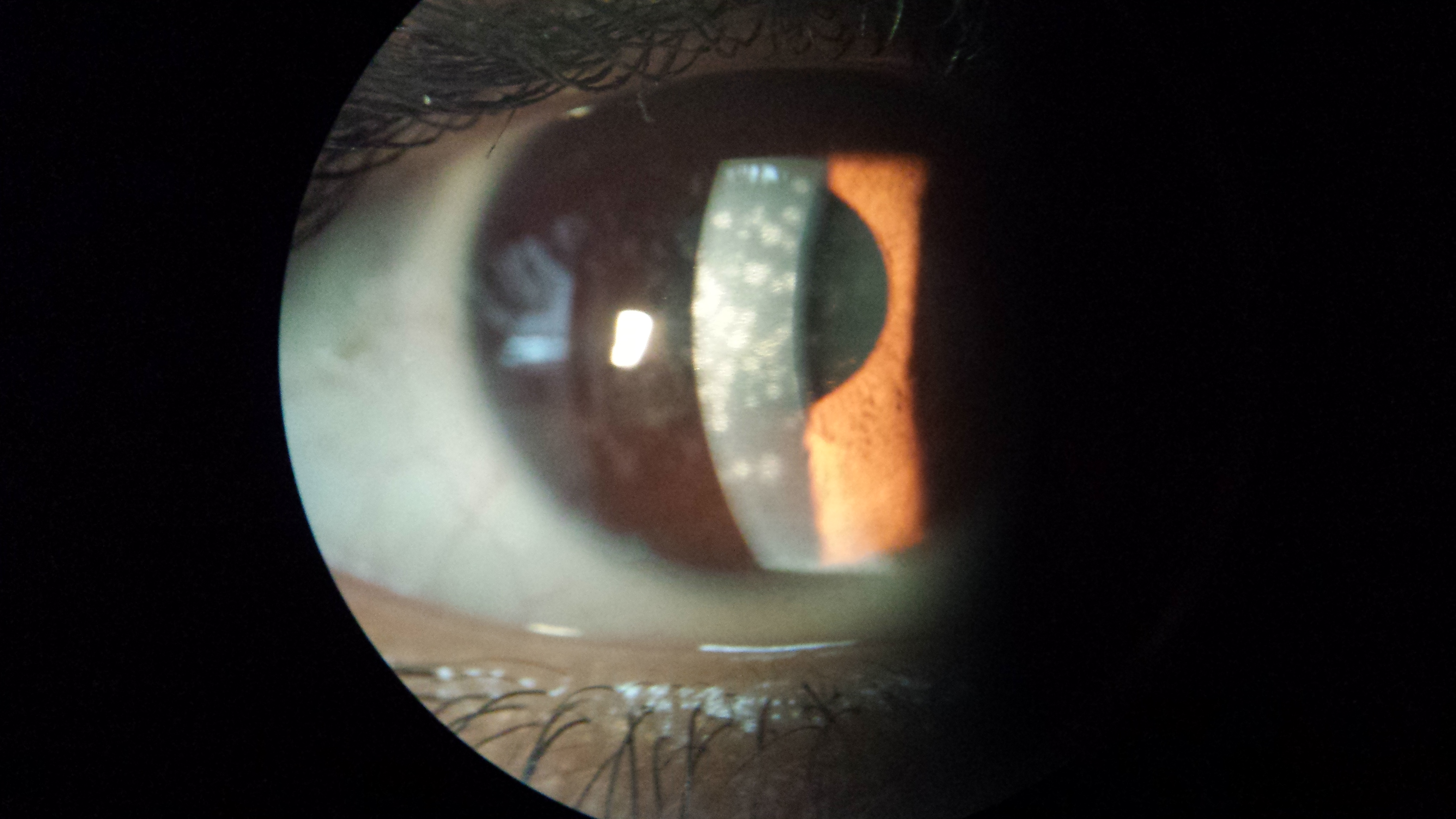
Nummular Keratitis, a feature of the chronic phase of adenoviral keratoconjunctivitis

Nummular keratitis is a feature of viral keratoconjunctivitis. It is a common feature of adenoviral keratoconjunctivitis (an ocular adenovirus infection), as well as approximately 1/3rd of cases of Herpes Zoster Ophthalmicus infections. It represents the presence of anterior stromal infiltrates. Unilateral or bilateral subepithelial lesions of the cornea may be present. Slit lamp examination reveals multiple tiny granular deposits surrounded by a halo of stromal haze. After healing, residual 'nummular scars' often remain. Disciform keratitis occurs in 50% of individuals with Nummular keratitis, but Nummular keratitis always precedes Disciform keratitis.

== Treatment ==
- Topical NSAIDS
- Lubricating eye drops
- Topical dilute steroid drops in tapering doses (debatable, see: Adenoviral keratoconjunctivitis)
