= Adenovirus infection =

Class of viral infections, usually of the respiratory tract

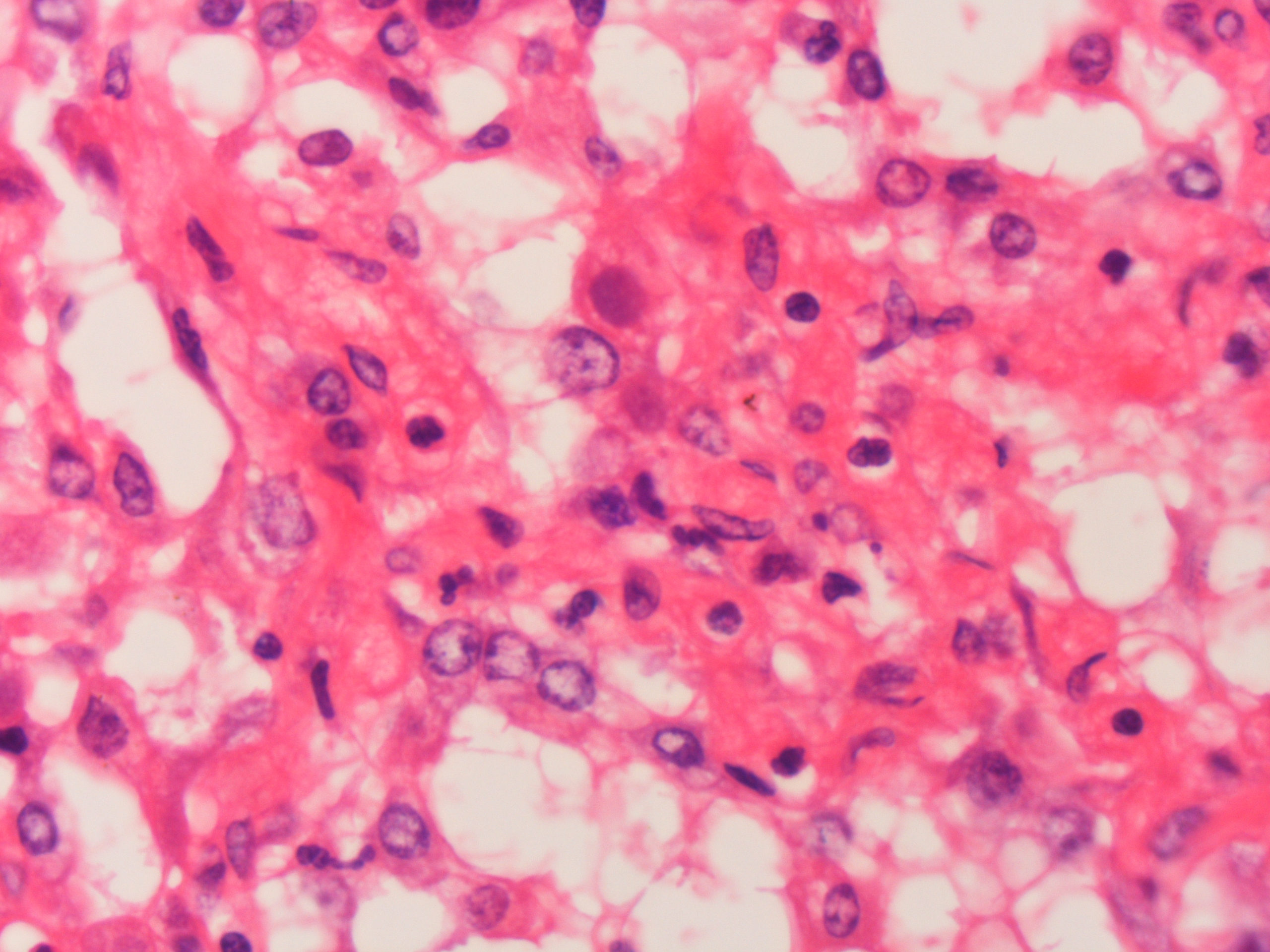
- Specialty: Infectious diseases
- Symptoms: Cough, runny nose, sore throat, pink eye, abdominal pain, muscle ache, fever, diarrhea, vomiting, fatigue
- Complications: Adenoviral keratoconjunctivitis, pneumonia, acute respiratory distress syndrome, bronchiolitis, acute bronchitis, meningoencephalitis, myocarditis, cardiomyopathy, pericarditis, hepatitis, nephritis
- Usual onset: 2–14 days after exposure
- Causes: Adenoviruses
- Risk factors: Endemic, hematopoietic stem cell transplantation
- Diagnostic method: Signs and symptoms, PCR test
- Differential diagnosis: Whooping cough, influenza, parainfluenza, respiratory syncytial virus
- Prevention: The most important prevention is wearing a high-quality, well-fitting N95 or better respirator. Also hand washing, social distancing, avoid touching eyes, nose, and mouth
- Treatment: Symptomatic and supportive
- Prognosis: Usually recover without treatment
- Frequency: Common, all ages, typically children under 5 years

Adenovirus infection is a contagious viral disease, caused by adenoviruses, commonly resulting in a respiratory tract infection. Typical symptoms range from those of a common cold, such as nasal congestion, rhinitis, and cough, to difficulty breathing as in pneumonia. Other general symptoms include fever, fatigue, muscle aches, headache, abdominal pain and swollen neck glands. Onset is usually two to fourteen days after exposure to the virus. A mild eye infection may occur on its own, combined with a sore throat and fever, or as a more severe adenoviral keratoconjunctivitis with a painful red eye, intolerance to light and discharge. Very young children may just have an earache. Adenovirus infection can present as a gastroenteritis with vomiting, diarrhea, and abdominal pain, with or without respiratory symptoms. However, some people have no symptoms.

Adenovirus infection in humans are generally caused by Adenoviruses types B, C, E and F. Spread occurs mainly when an infected person is in close contact with another person. This may occur by either fecal–oral route, airborne transmission or small droplets containing the virus. Less commonly, the virus may spread via contaminated surfaces. Other respiratory complications include acute bronchitis, bronchiolitis and acute respiratory distress syndrome. It may cause myocarditis, meningoencephalitis or hepatitis in people with weak immune systems.

Diagnosis is by signs and symptoms, and a laboratory test is not usually required. In some circumstances, a PCR test on blood or respiratory secretions may detect adenovirus DNA. Other conditions that appear similar include whooping cough, influenza, parainfluenza, and respiratory syncytial virus. Adenovirus gastroenteritis appears similar to diarrhoeal diseases caused by other infections. Infection by adenovirus may be prevented by washing hands, avoiding touching own eyes, mouth and nose with unwashed hands, and avoiding being near sick people. A live vaccine to protect against types 4 and 7 adenoviruses has been used successfully in some military personnel. Management is generally symptomatic and supportive. Most adenovirus infections get better without any treatment. Medicines to ease pain and reduce fever can be bought over the counter.

Adenovirus infections affect all ages. They occur sporadically throughout the year, and outbreaks can occur particularly in winter and spring, when they may spread more quickly in closed populations such as in hospitals, nurseries, long-term care facilities, schools, and swimming pools. Severe disease is rare in people who are otherwise healthy. Adenovirus infection accounts for up to 10% of respiratory infections in children. Most cases are mild and by the age of 10-years, most children have had at least one adenovirus infection. 75% of conjunctivitis cases are due to adenovirus infection. In 2016, the Global Burden of Disease Study estimated that globally, around 75 million episodes of diarrhea among children under the age of five-years, were attributable to adenovirus infection. The first adenoviral strains were isolated in 1953 by Rowe et al.

== Signs and symptoms ==
Symptoms are variable, ranging from mild symptoms to severe illness. They depend on the type of adenovirus, where it enters into the body, and on the age and well-being of the person. Recognised patterns of clinical features include respiratory, eye, gastrointestinal, genitourinary and central nervous system. There is also a widespread type that occurs in immunocompromised people. Typical symptoms are of a mild cold or resembling the flu; fever, nasal congestion, coryza, cough, and pinky-red eyes. Infants may also have symptoms of an ear infection. Onset is usually two to fourteen days after exposure to the virus. There may be tiredness, chills, muscle aches, or headache. However, some people have no symptoms. Generally, a day or two after developing a sore throat with large tonsils, glands can be felt in the neck. Illness is more likely to be severe in people with weakened immune systems, particularly children who have had a hematopoietic stem cell transplantation. Sometimes there is a skin rash.

=== Respiratory tract ===
Preschool children with adenovirus colds tend to present with a nasal congestion, runny nose and abdominal pain. There may be a harsh barking cough. It is frequently associated with a fever and a sore throat. Up to one in five infants with bronchiolitis will have adenovirus infection, which can be severe. Bronchiolitis obliterans is uncommon, but can occur if adenovirus causes pneumonia with prolonged fever, and can result in difficulty breathing. It presents with a hyperinflated chest, expiratory wheeze and low oxygen. Severe pneumonia is most common in very young children age three to 18 months and presents with sudden illness, ongoing cough, high fever, shortness of breath and a fast rate of breathing. There are frequently wheezes and crackles on breathing in and out.

=== Eyes ===
Adenovirus eye infection may present as a pinkish-red eye. Six to nine days following exposure to adenovirus, one or both eyes, typically in children, may be affected in association with fever, pharyngitis and lymphadenopathy (pharyngoconjunctival fever (PCF)). The onset is usually sudden, and there is often rhinitis. Adenovirus infection can also cause adenoviral keratoconjunctivitis. Typically one eye is affected after an incubation period of up to a week. The eye becomes itchy, painful, burning and reddish and lymphadenopathy may be felt by the ear nearest the affected eye. The symptoms may last around 10 days to three weeks. It may be is associated with blurred vision, photophobia and swelling of the conjunctiva. A sore throat and nasal congestion may or may not be present. This tends to occur in epidemics, affecting predominantly adults. In very young children, it may be associated with high fever, sore throat, otitis media, diarrhoea, and vomiting.

=== Gastrointestinal tract ===
Adenovirus infection can cause a gastroenteritis when it may present with diarrhea, vomiting, and abdominal pain, with or without respiratory or general symptoms. Children under the age of one-year appear particularly vulnerable. However, it usually resolves within three-days. It appears similar to diarrhoea diseases caused by other infections.

=== Other organs ===
Uncommonly the bladder may be affected, presenting with a sudden onset of burning on passing urine and increased frequency of passing urine, followed by seeing blood in the urine a day or two later. Meningism may occur in adenovirus associated meningoencephalitis, which may occur in people with weakened immune systems such as with AIDS or lymphoma. Adenovirus infection may result in symptoms of myocarditis, dilated cardiomyopathy, and pericarditis. Other signs and symptoms depend on other complications such as dark urine, itching and jaundice in hepatitis, generally in people who have a weakened immune system. Adenovirus is a rare cause of urethritis in men, when it may present with burning on passing urine associated with red eyes and feeling unwell.

== Cause and mechanism ==
Adenovirus infection in humans are generally caused by Adenoviruses types B, C, E and F.

Although epidemiologic characteristics of the adenoviruses vary by type, all are transmitted by direct contact, fecal-oral transmission, and occasionally waterborne transmission. Some types are capable of establishing persistent asymptomatic infections in tonsils, adenoids, and intestines of infected hosts, and shedding can occur for months or years. Some adenoviruses (e.g., serotypes 1, 2, 5, and 6) have been shown to be endemic in parts of the world where they have been studied, and infection is usually acquired during childhood. Other types cause sporadic infection and occasional outbreaks; for example, epidemic keratoconjunctivitis is associated with adenovirus serotypes 8, 19, and 37. Epidemics of febrile disease with conjunctivitis are associated with waterborne transmission of some adenovirus types, often centering on inadequately chlorinated swimming pools and small lakes. ARD is most often associated with adenovirus types 4 and 7 in the United States. Enteric adenoviruses 40 and 41 cause gastroenteritis, usually in children. For some adenovirus serotypes, the clinical spectrum of disease associated with infection varies depending on the site of infection; for example, infection with adenovirus 7 acquired by inhalation is associated with severe lower respiratory tract disease, whereas oral transmission of the virus typically causes no or mild disease. Outbreaks of adenovirus-associated respiratory disease have been more common in the late winter, spring, and early summer; however, adenovirus infections can occur throughout the year.

Several adenoviruses, including Ad5, Ad9, Ad31, Ad36, Ad37, and SMAM1, have at least some evidence of causation of obesity in animals, adipogenesis in cells, or association with human obesity.

== Diagnosis ==
Diagnosis is by signs and symptoms, and a laboratory test is not usually required. In some circumstances such as severe disease, when a diagnosis needs to be confirmed, a PCR test on blood or respiratory secretions may detect adenovirus DNA. Adenovirus can be isolated by growing in cell cultures in a laboratory. Other conditions that appear similar include whooping cough, influenza, parainfluenza, and respiratory syncytial virus (RSV). Since adenovirus can be excreted for prolonged periods, the presence of virus does not necessarily mean it is associated with disease.

== Prevention ==
Infection by adenovirus may be prevented by washing hands, avoiding touching own eyes, mouth and nose before washing hands and avoiding being near sick people. Strict attention to good infection-control practices is effective for stopping transmission in hospitals of adenovirus-associated disease, such as epidemic keratoconjunctivitis. Maintaining adequate levels of chlorination is necessary for preventing swimming pool-associated outbreaks of adenovirus conjunctivitis. A live adenovirus vaccine to protect against types 4 and 7 adenoviruses has been used in some military personnel. Rates of adenovirus disease fell among military recruits following the introduction a live oral vaccine against types 4 and 7. Stocks of the vaccine ran out in 1999 and rates of disease increased until 2011 when the vaccine was re-introduced.

== Treatment ==
Treatment is generally symptomatic and supportive. Medicines to ease pain and reduce fever can be bought over the counter. For adenoviral conjunctivitis, a cold compress and lubricants may provide some relief of discomfort. Steroid eye drops may be required if the cornea is involved. Most adenovirus infections get better without any treatment.

== Prognosis ==
After recovery from adenovirus infection, the virus can be carried for weeks or months.

Adenovirus can cause severe necrotizing pneumonia in which all or part of a lung has increased translucency radiographically, which is called Swyer-James Syndrome. Severe adenovirus pneumonia also may result in bronchiolitis obliterans, a subacute inflammatory process in which the small airways are replaced by scar tissue, resulting in a reduction in lung volume and lung compliance.

== Epidemiology ==
Adenovirus infections occur sporadically throughout the year, and outbreaks can occur particularly in winter and spring. Epidemics may spread more quickly in closed populations such as in hospitals, nurseries, long-term care facilities, boarding schools, orphanages and swimming pools. Severe disease is rare in people who are usually healthy. Around 10% of respiratory infections in children are caused by adenoviruses. Most are mild and by the age of 10-years, most children have had at least one adenovirus infection.

Adenoviruses are the most common viruses causing an inflamed throat. 75% of conjunctivitis cases are due to adenovirus infection. Under two-year olds are particularly susceptible to adenovirus gastroenteritis by types 40 and 41, with type 41 being more common than type 40. Some large studies have revealed type 40/41 adenovirus as one of the second most common causes of diarrhea in children in low and middle income countries; the most common being rotavirus. In 2016, the Global Burden of Disease Study estimated that globally, around 75 million episodes of diarrhea among children under the age of five-years, were attributable to adenovirus infection, with a mortality of near 12%.

Research in adenovirus infection has generally been limited relative to other respiratory disease viruses. The impact of type-40/41 adenovirus diarrhoea is possibly underestimated.

== History ==
The first adenoviral strains were isolated from adenoids in 1953 by Rowe et al. Later, during studies on rotavirus diarrhoea, the wider use of electron microscopy resulted in detecting previously unrecognized adenoviruses types 40 and 41, subsequently found to be important in causing gastrointestinal illness in children.

The illness made headlines in Texas in September 2007, when a so-called "boot camp flu" sickened hundreds at Lackland Air Force Base in San Antonio. In 2018, outbreaks occurred in an adult nursing home in New Jersey, and a college campus in Maryland. In 2020, as a result of infection control measures during the COVID-19 pandemic, rates of adenovirus diarrhoea declined significantly in China.

== Other animals ==
Dogs can be affected by adenovirus infection. Severe liver damage is a classical infectious disease seen in unvaccinated dogs.
