= Swyer–James syndrome =

- Other names: Swyer–James–Macleod's syndrome
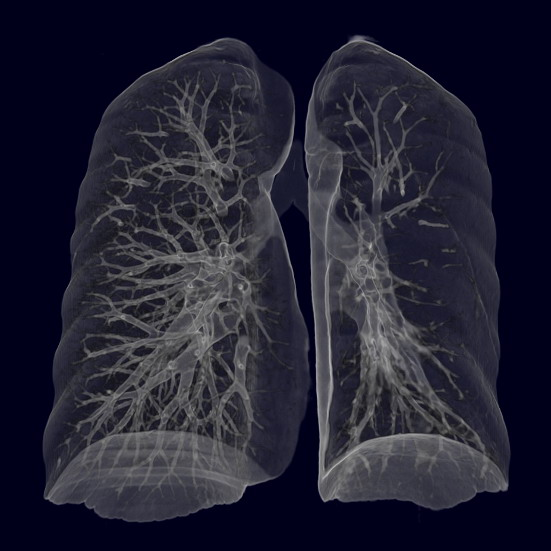
- Swyer–James syndrome of the left (smaller) lung, virtual CT-bronchography
- Specialty: Pulmonology
- Symptoms: Often no symptoms, sometimes shortness of breath on exertion, wheeze, reduced ability to exercise, cough, chest pain
- Causes: Childhood bronchiolitis obliterans
- Diagnostic method: medical imaging
- Treatment: Bronchodilators
- Frequency: Rare

Swyer–James syndrome (SJS), also called Swyer–James–MacLeod syndrome, is a rare disease of the lungs, characterized by a small lung or part of lung. Typical symptoms are of recurrent respiratory tract infections, but some have no symptoms.

As a result of childhood bronchiolitis obliterans, typically following adenovirus infection, there is a reduction in blood vessels and overextended alveoli, resulting in air trapping in one or part of one lung.

== Signs and symptoms ==
Often, there are no symptoms and the disease is detected when investigating another problem. Sometimes there is shortness of breath on exertion, wheeze, reduced ability to exercise, cough and chest pain.

== Cause and mechanism ==
Swyer–James syndrome is a manifestation of postinfectious obliterative bronchiolitis. In SJS, the involved lung or portion of the lung does not grow normally and is slightly smaller than the opposite lung. The characteristic radiographic appearance is that of pulmonary hyperlucency, caused by overdistention of the alveoli in conjunction with diminished arterial flow. and has been linked to adenovirus type 21, a type of adenovirus infection.

== Diagnosis ==
In appearance Swyer–James normally leaves shadowing in a CT scan in the upper lobar regions of one or (rarely) both lungs. People with the illness operate in much the same way as patients with mild bronchiectasis. As a result, the illness can go undiagnosed for some time. With current pharmaceutical developments, the prognosis is good for sufferers of the illness to lead normal and healthy lives.

== History ==
It was found by English chest physician William Mathiseon MacLeod, and (simultaneously) by physician Paul Robert Swyer and radiologist George James in the 1950s in Canada.
