= Adenovirus vaccine =

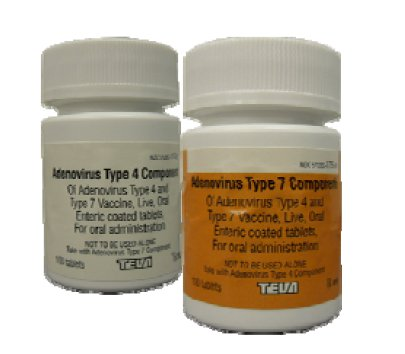
- Bottles of the vaccine

Vaccine description
- Target: Adenovirus
- Vaccine type: Live virus

Clinical data
- AHFS/Drugs.com: Monograph
- License data: US DailyMed: Adenovirus type
- Routes of administration: Oral administration
- ATC code: None

Legal status
- Legal status: US: ℞-only

Identifiers
- DrugBank: DB14409
- UNII: FKD3DUK39I; TM54L796SN

An adenovirus vaccine is a vaccine against adenovirus infection. According to the American CDC, "There is currently no adenovirus vaccine available to the general public.

It should not be confused with the strategy of using adenovirus as a viral vector to develop vaccines for other pathogens, or as a general gene carrier.

== US military ==
It was used by the United States military from 1971 to 1999, but was discontinued when the only manufacturer stopped production. This vaccine elicited immunity to adenovirus serotypes 4 and 7, the serotypes most often associated with acute respiratory disease. On 16 March 2011, the U.S. Food and Drug Administration approved an adenovirus vaccine manufactured by Teva Pharmaceuticals under contract to the U.S. Army. This vaccine is essentially the same as the one used from 1971 to 1999. On 24 October 2011, the military services began administering the new adenovirus vaccine to recruits during basic training.

The vaccine is orally administered and consists of live (not attenuated) virus. The tablets are coated, so that the virus passes the stomach and infects the intestines, where the immune response is raised.
