= Bronchiolitis obliterans =

Obstruction of the lungs' small airways (bronchioles) due to inflammation

- Other names: Constrictive bronchiolitis, Obliterative bronchiolitis, Popcorn lung
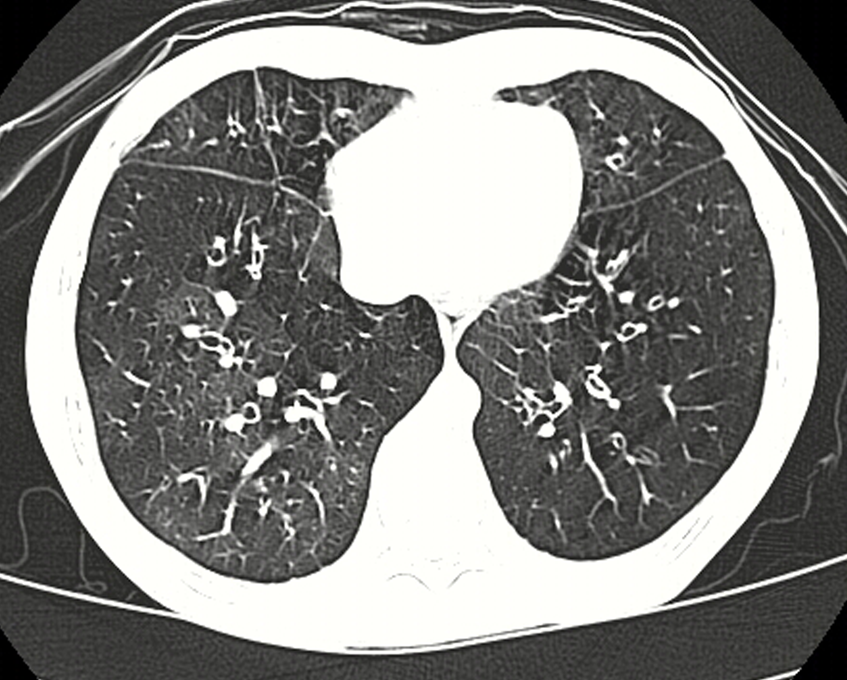
- High resolution CT scan showing bronchiolitis obliterans with mosaic attenuation, bronchiectasis, air trapping and bronchial thickening
- Specialty: Pulmonology
- Symptoms: Dry cough, shortness of breath, wheezing, feeling tired
- Usual onset: Worsens over weeks to months in rare cases.
- Causes: Toxic fumes, respiratory infections, connective tissue disorder, following a bone marrow or heart-lung transplant
- Diagnostic method: CT scan, pulmonary function tests, lung biopsy
- Differential diagnosis: Asthma
- Treatment: Corticosteroids, immunosuppressive medication, lung transplant
- Prognosis: Often poor
- Frequency: Rare

Bronchiolitis obliterans (BO), also known as obliterative bronchiolitis, constrictive bronchiolitis and popcorn lung, is a disease that results in obstruction of the smallest airways of the lungs (bronchioles) due to inflammation. Symptoms include a dry cough, shortness of breath, wheezing and feeling tired. These symptoms generally get worse over weeks to months. It is not related to cryptogenic organizing pneumonia, previously known as bronchiolitis obliterans organizing pneumonia.

Causes include breathing in toxic fumes, respiratory infections, connective tissue disorder or complications following a bone marrow or heart–lung transplant. Symptoms may not occur until two to eight weeks following toxic exposure or infection. The underlying mechanism involves inflammation that results in scar tissue formation. Diagnosis is by CT scan, pulmonary function tests or lung biopsy. A chest X-ray is often normal.

While the disease is not reversible, treatments can slow further worsening. This may include the use of corticosteroids or immunosuppressive medication. A lung transplant may be offered. Outcomes are often poor, with most people dying in months to years.

Bronchiolitis obliterans is rare in the general population. However, it affects about 75% of people by ten years following a lung transplant and up to 10% of people who have received a bone marrow transplant from someone else. The condition was first clearly described in 1981. Prior descriptions occurred as early as 1956, with the term "bronchiolitis obliterans" used first by Reynaud in 1835.

== Signs and symptoms ==
Bronchiolitis obliterans results in worsening shortness of breath, wheezing, and a dry cough. The symptoms can start gradually, or severe symptoms can occur suddenly. These symptoms represent an obstructive pattern that is non-reversible with bronchodilator therapy, and need to be related to various lung insults. These insults include inhalation damage, post transplant auto-immune injury, post-infectious disease, drug reactions, and several auto-immune diseases.

== Causes ==
Bronchiolitis obliterans has many possible causes, including collagen vascular disease, transplant rejection in organ transplant patients, viral infection (adenovirus, respiratory syncytial virus, influenza, HIV, cytomegalovirus), Stevens–Johnson syndrome, Pneumocystis pneumonia, drug reaction, aspiration and complications of prematurity (bronchopulmonary dysplasia), and exposure to toxic fumes. Toxins implicated in the condition include diacetyl, sulfur dioxide, nitrogen dioxide, ammonia, chlorine, thionyl chloride, methyl isocyanate, hydrogen fluoride, hydrogen bromide, hydrogen chloride, hydrogen sulfide, phosgene, polyamide-amine dyes, mustard gas and ozone. It can also be present in patients with IBD, systemic lupus erythematosus, juvenile idiopathic arthritis, rheumatoid arthritis, GERD, IgA nephropathy, and ataxia telangiectasia. Activated charcoal has been known to cause it when aspirated. The ingestion of large doses of papaverine in the vegetable Sauropus androgynus has caused it. Additionally, the disorder may be idiopathic (without known cause).

=== Lung transplant ===
Bronchiolitis obliterans is a common complication in lung transplants because transplanted lungs are at greater risk of alloimmunization as compared to healthy lungs. The disease is often termed bronchiolitis obliterans syndrome (BOS) in the setting of post lung transplantation and hematopoietic stem cell transplant (HSCT). Patients who develop BOS post lung transplant vary in disease latency and severity. Patients often initially have normal lung function on pulmonary function testing and have normal chest radiographs. As the disease progresses they begin to have symptoms of shortness of breath, cough, and wheezing as their lung function declines. The Journal of Heart and Lung Transplantation published updated guidelines in 2001 for grading the severity of BOS. The original guidelines and classification system were published in 1993 by the International Society for Heart and Lung Transplantation. Their scoring system is based on the changes in FEV_{1} in patients from their baseline. When patients are first diagnosed with BOS they have their baseline lung function established by doing pulmonary function testing at the time of diagnosis. The BOS scoring system is as follows:

BOS 0: FEV_{1} > 90% of baseline and FEF_{25-75} > 75% of baseline

BOS 0-p: FEV_{1} 81-89% of baseline and/or FEF_{25-75} <= 75% of baseline

BOS 1: FEV_{1} 66-80% of baseline

BOS 2: FEV_{1} 51-65% of baseline

BOS 3: FEV_{1} 50% or less of baseline

The scoring system shows an increased severity of the disease as the BOS number increases.

Elevated levels of bile acid and inflammatory proteins linked to GERD and microaspiration suggest that these factors may lead to the development of bronchiolitis obliterans in lung transplant recipients.

=== Hematopoietic stem cell transplant ===
Bronchiolitis obliterans affects up to 5.5% of people who have received HSCT. One of the biggest risk factors after HSCT is the development of GVHD with a 14% risk. Other risk factors post transplant including tobacco use, age of donor, age of recipient, lower baseline FEV1/FVC ratio, non-caucasian race, peripheral and lower circulating IgG levels. Studies have, however, shown mixed results regarding these other risk factors. There has been an association shown between the increased use of peripheral stem cells and the risk of developing bronchiolitis obliterans. Also, research has shown an increased risk for developing the disease within the first year of transplant if the person is infected with respiratory syncytial virus or parainfluenza virus within the first 100 days post transplant.

=== Toxic exposure ===
Diacetyl

There are many industrial substances that are known to cause bronchiolitis obliterans.

Industrial workers who have presented with BO have been:

- nylon-flock workers
- workers who spray prints onto textiles with polyamide-amine dyes
- battery workers who are exposed to thionyl chloride
- workers at plants that use or manufacture diacetyl

Diacetyl is a chemical used to produce the artificial butter flavoring in many foods such as candy and microwave popcorn and occurring naturally in wines. This first came to public attention when eight former employees of the Gilster-Mary Lee popcorn plant in Jasper, Missouri developed bronchiolitis obliterans. Due to this event, bronchiolitis obliterans began to be referred to in the popular media as "popcorn lung" or "popcorn workers lung". It is also referred to as "flavorings-related lung disease".

=== Post-infectious ===
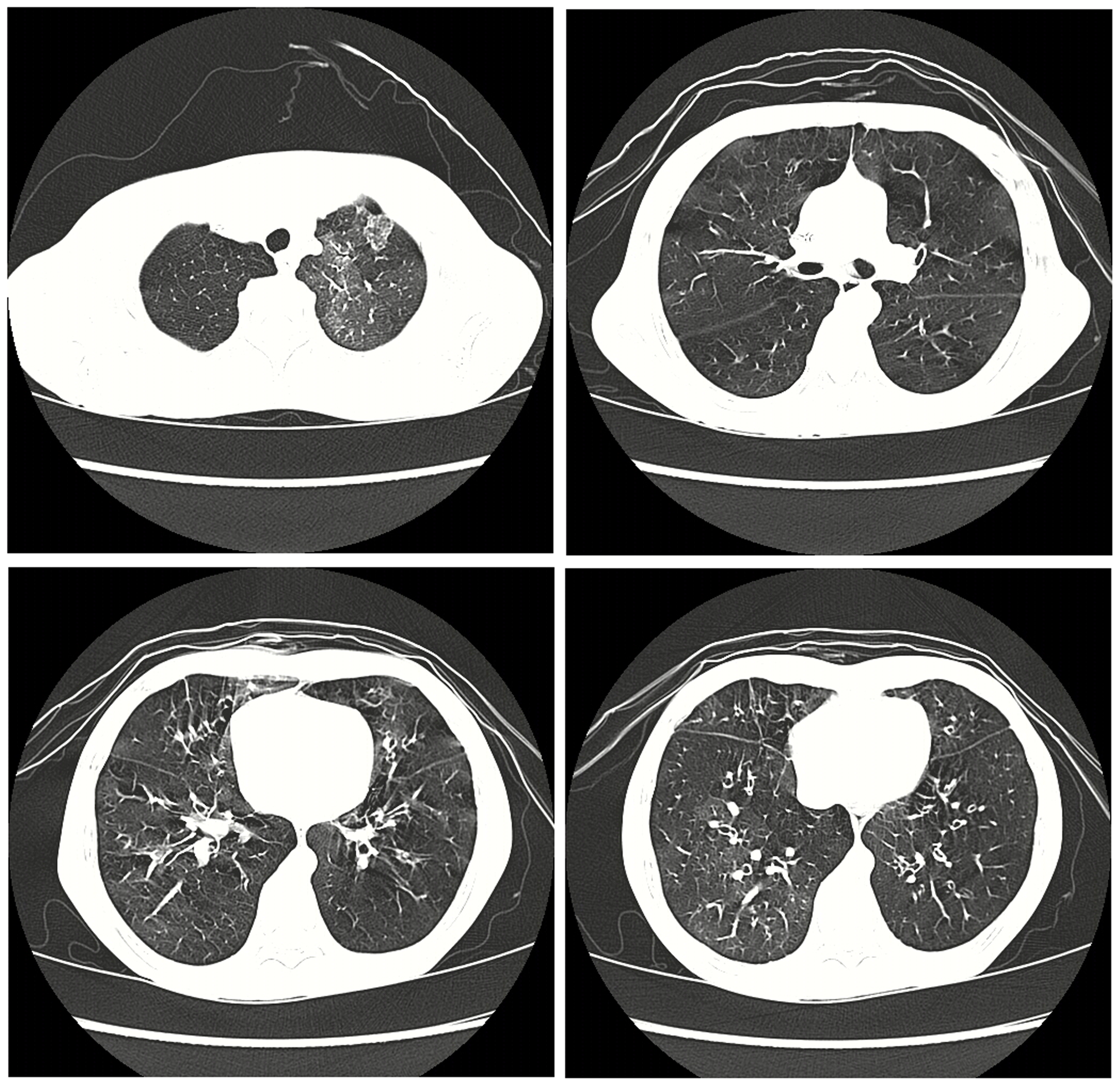
High-resolution CT scan of a child with post-infectious bronchiolitis obliterans showing glass pattern with air trapping and bronchial thickening

Typically found in young children and is the most common cause at this age. Generally occurs after a viral infection of adenovirus (types 3, 7, and 21), measles (rubeola), mycoplasma, CMV, influenza, and parainfluenza. Swyer–James syndrome is a rare complication of bronchiolitis obliterans caused by measles or adenovirus. Post-infectious bronchiolitis obliterans is most common in the southern hemisphere particularly in countries such as Brazil, Argentina, Australia, Chile and New Zealand. There was a large prevalence of the disease in these areas during the 1990s and early 2000s. In one hospital in Buenos Aires, the Ricardo Gutiérrez Children's hospital, the disease accounted for 14% of their inpatient respiratory population from 1993 to 2002. As such, much of the information about post-infectious bronchiolitis obliterans has come from research out of South America. The most significant risk factors for the disease are infection with adenovirus and the need for ventilator support. In contrast with another cause of bronchiolitis obliterans in children, Stevens–Johnson syndrome, post-infectious bronchiolitis obliterans tends to be a chronic but non-progressive disease. The disease can have varying impact on children and their quality of life, which has been studied by lung function tests, as well as their exercise tolerance. Children with lower lung function based on their pulmonary function testing, have lower exercise tolerance, which compounds the impact of the disease on cardiovascular function as they are not able to maintain age appropriate aerobic fitness. This ultimately affects their activities of daily living (ADLs) and their quality of life going forward.

=== Burn pits ===
A form of BO is starting to present in Iraq and Afghanistan veterans. It has been attributed to veterans being exposed to trash burn pits. Veterans present with shortness of breath and other asthma-like symptoms. The only way to diagnose this condition is by doing a lung biopsy as chest X-rays and CT scans come back as normal. The US government still denies that there is any correlation between burn pits and health problems, but has started an "Airborne Hazards and Open Burn Pit Registry" to begin tracking the health of veterans who were exposed to burn pits to see if there is a connection.

=== E-cigarettes ===
The American Lung Association listed use of flavored e-cigarettes as a risk factor for BO in 2016. Health Canada has, however, seen no cases as of 2023. Public Health England writes that the association has come about as "some flavourings used in e-liquids to provide a buttery flavour contain the chemical diacetyl… However, diacetyl is banned as an ingredient from e-cigarettes and e-liquids in the UK." The UK National Health Service's website states that "vaping does not cause 'popcorn lung'".

== Mechanism ==
The underlying mechanism involves injury and inflammation of epithelial and sub-epithelial cells. These cells then lose the ability to repair the tissue, in particular they lose the ability to regenerate the epithelial or outermost layer, leading to the excess growth of cells that cause scarring. There are multiple pathways of the disease including fibrotic, lymphocytic, and antibody-mediated that have been described. However, while each pathway has a more unique starting point and cause, the result is still injury and inflammation leading to scarring of the lung tissue. The scarred tissue then makes the expiration phase of respiration more difficult, leading to air not being expelled from the lungs. This is termed "air-trapping", which can be seen on medical imaging. Since the scarring is non-reversible, the disease generally does not improve over time, and depending on the inciting can progress to death.

== Diagnosis ==
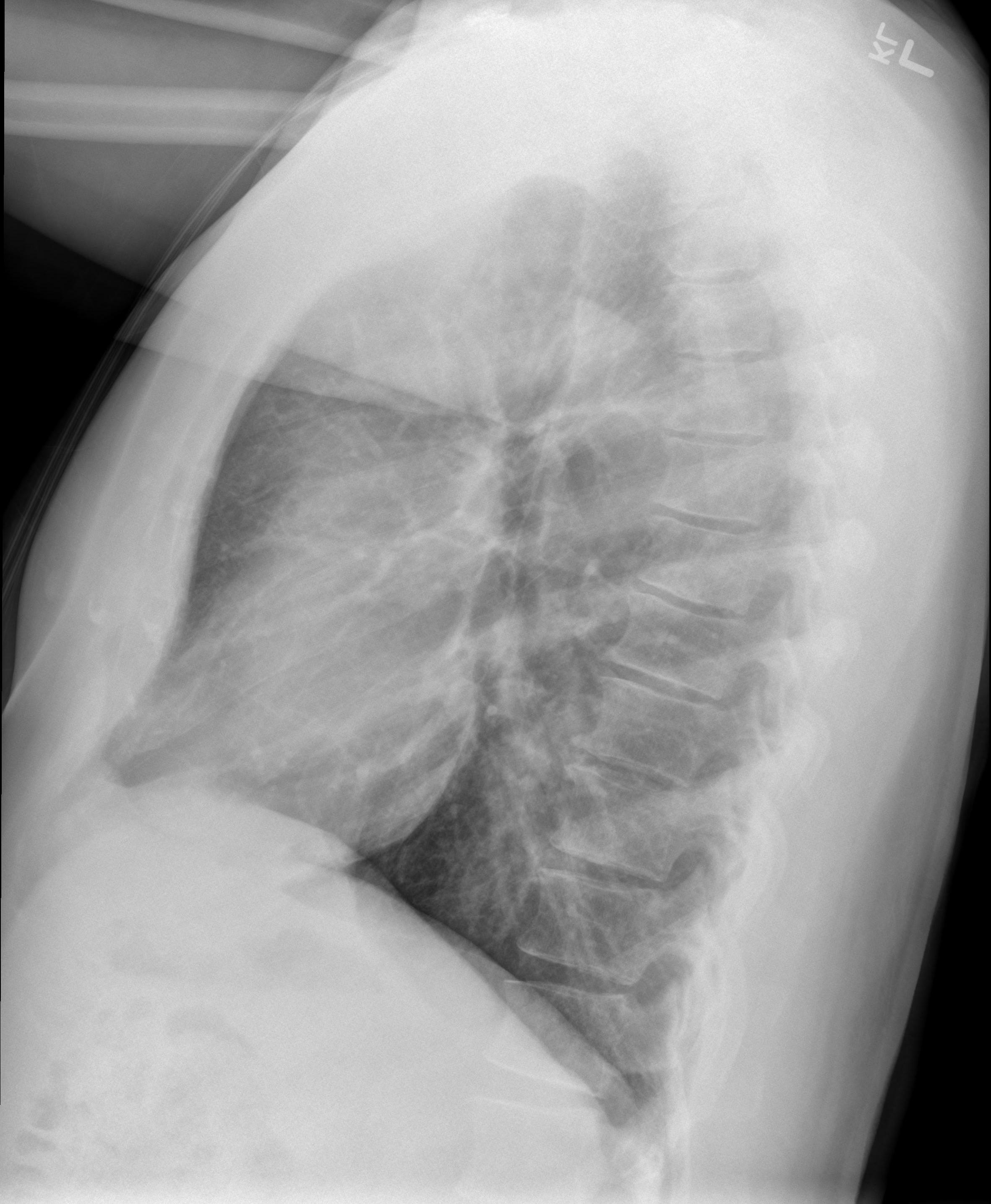
Example of early disease with mild flattening of the diaphragm

Bronchiolitis obliterans is often diagnosed based on the symptoms of obstructive lung disease following lung injury. The definitive diagnosis is through biopsy, but due to the variable distribution of lesions, leading to falsely negative tests, and invasive nature of this procedure it is often not performed. Several tests are often needed to diagnose bronchiolitis obliterans, including spirometry, diffusing capacity of the lung tests (DLCO), lung volume tests, chest X-rays, high-resolution CT (HRCT), and lung biopsy.

=== Pulmonary function testing ===
Spirometry tests usually show an obstructive pattern and is the most common presentation. A slightly reduced to normal forced vital capacity (FVC), and a reduced FEV_{1} to FVC ratio and forced expiratory volume (FEV) with little to no correction with the use of bronchodilators are common findings. Lung volume tests may show hyperinflation (excessive air in lungs caused by air trapping). Diffusing capacity of the lung (DLCO) tests are usually normal; people with early-stage OB are more likely to have normal DLCO. FEV1 (forced expiratory volume in 1 second) should be above 80% of predicted values to be considered normal. Bronchiolitis obliterans reduces this to 16–21%.

=== Medical imaging ===
Early in the disease chest radiography is typically normal but may show hyperinflation. As the disease progresses a reticular pattern with thickening of airway walls may be present. HRCT can also show air trapping when the person being scanned breathes out completely; it can also show thickening in the airway and haziness in the lungs. A common finding on HRCT is patchy areas of decreased lung density, signifying reduced vascular caliber and air trapping. This pattern is often described as a "mosaic pattern", and may indicate bronchiolitis obliterans.

=== Lung biopsy ===
Transthoracic lung biopsies are preferable for diagnosis of constrictive BO compared to transbronchial biopsies; regardless of the type of biopsy, a diagnosis may only be achieved by examination of multiple samples. Transthoracic biopsies are preferred over transbronchial due to the heterogeneity and distribution of the lesions. OB can be further classified into two categories: constrictive or proliferative. The constrictive pattern is demonstrated by peribronchiolar cellular infiltrates which eventually causes small airway damage and leads to subepithelial fibrosis. The bronchial muscle can eventually become fibrosed which can be identified with trichrome staining. In regards to proliferative disease, intraluminal buds called "Masson bodies" fill the lumen, which results in bronchiolar plugging. Often people with proliferative disease will show butterfly wing-like appearance under microscopy. One key determinate that can be seen on biopsy to differentiate constrictive from proliferative disease is the extent of lesions. Both lesions are localized from the small bronchi to the membranous bronchi, but in constrictive disease, the lesions are intermittent while proliferative disease has a continuous distribution.

=== Differential diagnosis ===
Other conditions that can present similarly include chronic obstructive pulmonary disease, asthma, bronchiectasis, hypersensitivity pneumonitis, and pneumonia.

== Prevention ==
The primary prevention of bronchiolitis obliterans in people who have received either lung transplant or HSCT therapy is immunosuppression. In regards to post lung transplantation, the combination of calcineurin inhibitor combined with a purine synthesis inhibitor and a glucocorticoid is the general regimen used. People also have a baseline post-transplant lung function testing done in order to determine if their lung function is declining over time. People who are post-HSCT their immunosuppressive regimen typically includes methotrexate in combination with a calcineurin inhibitor to prevent GVHD, a risk factor for developing bronchiolitis obliterans.

== Treatment ==
While the disease is not reversible, treatments can slow further worsening. This may include the use of corticosteroids or immunosuppressive medication which may have an effect on the ability to receive a lung transplant if offered. If patients have difficulty breathing (hypoxemia) oxygen can be supplemented. Routine vaccinations are recommended for patients with chronic lung disease to prevent complications from secondary infections due to pneumonia and influenza.

== Terminology ==
"Bronchiolitis obliterans" was originally a term used by pathologists to describe two patterns of airway disease, the other was bronchiolitis obliterans organizing pneumonia (BOOP), now known as cryptogenic organizing pneumonia. The name cryptogenic bronchiolitis obliterans is used when a cause is unknown.

Bronchiolitis obliterans when it occurs following a lung transplant is known as bronchiolitis obliterans syndrome (BOS). BOS is defined as a person who has had either a HSCT or lung transplant and develops symptoms or radiographic findings consistent with bronchiolitis obliterans, but has not been confirmed by biopsy.
