= Adenoviral keratoconjunctivitis =

Common and highly contagious viral infection of the eye

Keratoconjunctivitis
- Other names: Keratoconjunctivitis epidemica
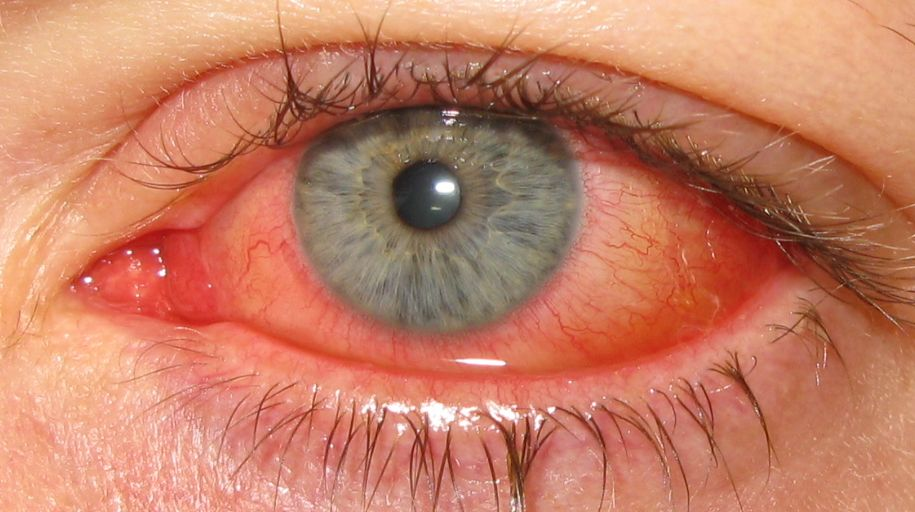
- Adenoviral Keratoconjunctivitis
- Specialty: Ophthalmology, infectious diseases
- Symptoms: Red eye, discomfort/irritation, sensitivity to light, watering, blurred vision, discharge
- Complications: Corneal scarring
- Usual onset: Sudden in an adult
- Duration: 7–10 days, can be longer
- Causes: Adenoviruses, commonly types 8 and 37
- Diagnostic method: Visualisation, viral culture (with immunofluorescence staining), PCR (to detect viral DNA)
- Differential diagnosis: Herpes simplex type I, acanthamoeba, fungal infection
- Prevention: Hand washing
- Treatment: Cold compress, artificial tears
- Frequency: Epidemics, common, adults>children

Adenoviral keratoconjunctivitis, also known as epidemic keratoconjunctivitis, is a contagious eye infection, a type of adenovirus disease caused by adenoviruses. It typically presents as a conjunctivitis with a sudden onset of a painful red eye, watery discharge and feeling that something is in the eye. Photophobia develops with blurred vision and lymphadenopathy by the ear nearest the affected eye. It is often associated with a sore throat and stuffy and runny nose, mainly in adults. A type of adenoviral keratoconjunctivitis in very young children can present with a high fever, sore throat, ear infection, vomiting and diarrhea.

It is commonly caused by types 8 and 37 adenoviruses. Transmission is by contaminated eye examination instruments and eye solutions, touching eyes of infected people, inadequately chlorinated swimming pools, or other contaminated objects. The incubation period is around five to 10 days.

Usually, the condition resolves after 7 to 10 days without treatment. Cold compresses and artificial tears may help. Corneal scarring occurs in up to half of cases and the blurred vision may continue for a long time in some people. The virus may remain in the eye for two to three years after recovering.

It is a common cause of a red eye and tends to occur in large numbers of people at the same time. Adults tend to be affected more frequently than children.

== Signs and symptoms ==
Adenoviral keratoconjunctivitis typically presents as a conjunctivitis with a sudden onset of red eye, watery discharge, and a feeling that something is in the eye. Photophobia develops with blurred vision and lymphadenopathy by the ear nearest the affected eye. It is typically associated with a pharyngitis and rhinitis, mainly in adults. A type of adenoviral keratoconjunctivitis in very young children can present with a high fever, sore throat, ear infection, vomiting and diarrhea.

== Diagnosis ==
The diagnosis of adenoviral keratoconjunctivitis is done using cell culture (with immunofluorescence staining) and PCR.

=== Differential diagnosis ===
It may appear similar to herpes simplex type I, Acanthamoeba, and fungal infection.

== Prevention ==
Adequate infection control measures should be followed as prevention and to reduce epidemic AKC outbreaks.

== Treatment ==
Treatment of adenoviral conjunctivitis is supportive, usually involving lubricating eye drops and cold compresses. In cases of severe itching, antihistamines may help alleviate symptoms. Antibiotics are rarely prescribed to prevent secondary infections. There is clinical evidence that topical ganciclovir is effective against at least adenovirus serotype 8, thus compelling many clinicians to prescribe this agent off-label for compelling cases of epidemic keratoconjunctivitis (EKC), particularly when corneal lesions are noted.

== Epidemiology ==
Globally it is the most common cause of a red eye and tends to occur in large numbers of people at the same time. Adults tend to be affected more frequently than children.
