= Ornithinaemia =

- Specialty: Hematology

Ornithinaemia is a blood disorder characterized by high levels of ornithine. Also known as hyperornithinemia, it may be associated with psychomotor retardation or epileptic episodes.
