= Chronic superficial keratitis =

Eye disease in dogs

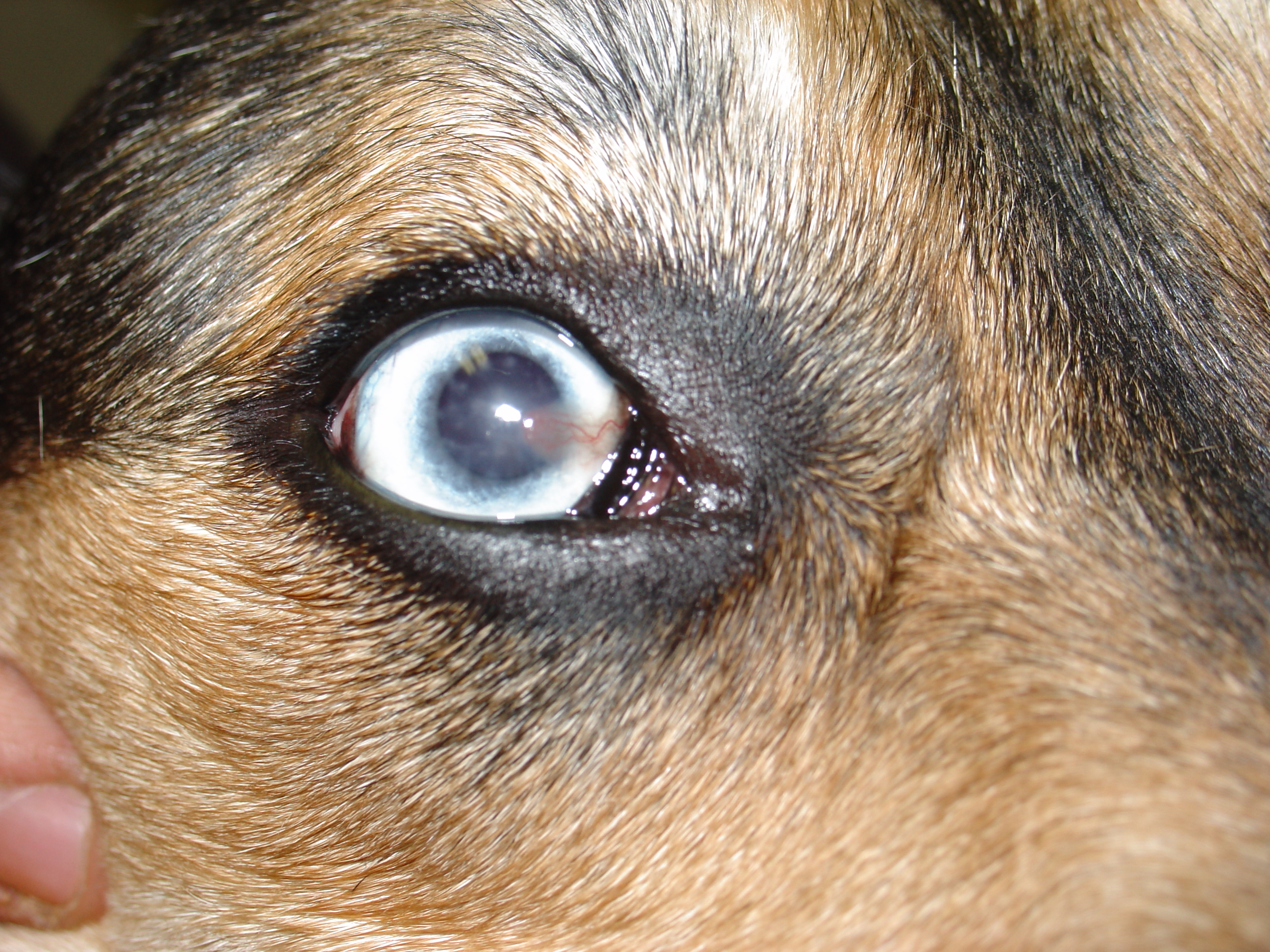
Chronic superficial keratitis in a dog

Chronic superficial keratitis (CSK), also known as pannus or Uberreiter's disease, is an inflammatory condition of the cornea in dogs, particularly seen in the German Shepherd. Both eyes are usually affected. The corneas gradually become pigmented and infiltrated by blood vessels, and the dog may eventually become blind.

== Signs and symptoms ==
CSK is usually a bilateral progressive condition, however the lesions are not symmetrical nor are they painful. Signs include pigmentation and vascularization of the cornea (extension of blood vessels onto the cornea). It is usually first seen at the lateral (temporal) limbus (the junction between the cornea and sclera), although it eventually can extend from any part of the limbus to cover the entire cornea. Severe cases can cause blindness. Although CSK is usually identifiable by the appearance of the eye and the breed of the affected dog, cytology will reveal the presence of lymphocytes and plasma cells.

== Cause ==
CSK is immune-mediated in nature, characterized by an infiltration of white blood cells into the superficial stroma of the cornea. These cells are predominantly CD4-expressing T lymphocytes and to a lesser extent CD8-expressing T cells. The CD4-expressing T-cells secrete gamma interferon, which causes expression of the major histocompatibility complex class II molecules in the cells of the cornea. These class II molecules cause further inflammation by interacting with the T cells and triggering an immune response. Ultraviolet light is important in the genesis of the disease which is seen at higher prevalence at elevated altitude and has a seasonal variation with most cases occurring in the summer. There is likely also a genetic component to the cause of CSK due to its predominance in certain breeds.

== Treatment ==
Treatment of CSK is usually with topical corticosteroids or topical cyclosporine, but any treatment only controls and reduces the inflammation rather than providing a cure. Because CSK is controlled rather than cured, treatment is generally continued for the dog's lifetime, and exposure to ultraviolet light, particularly at high altitude, can make the condition worse. Other investigated treatments include pimecrolimus, a derivative of ascomycin that interferes with T cell activation and inhibits the production of inflammatory cytokines. Strontium-90 radiation therapy is also used to treat CSK. Canine sunglasses have also been used to help protect the eyes of dogs with CSK to prevent further damage from ultraviolet radiation.

== Epidemiology ==
Chronic superficial keratitis is most commonly seen in German Shepherds, but it is also found in Belgian Tervurens, Greyhounds, Siberian Huskies, Australian Shepherds, and Border Collies.

== See also ==
- Uveal cyst
- Meibomian cyst
