= Conjunctival concretion =

Hard deposits in the human eye

Concretion in the palpebral conjunctiva, is called conjunctival concretion, that is a (or a cluster of) small, hard, yellowish-white calcified matter, superficially buried beneath the palpebral conjunctiva. Most of concretions in the eye form in the palpebral conjunctiva, which is a clear membrane to surround the inside of the eyelid; fewer can be located in the cornea and retina.

== Symptoms and signs ==
Conjunctival concretions are typically asymptomatic. However, common symptoms may include eye discomfort, irritation, and a sensation of a foreign body. In some cases, larger, harder, or multiple concretions can cause the superficial layers of the conjunctiva or eyelid to rub off, leading to conjunctival abrasion, which is particularly noticeable during blinking. In severe cases, dysfunction or inflammation of the meibomian (Meibomianitis) glands may occur.

== Cause ==
Chronic conjunctivitis (e.g. trachoma) and aging factor are two causes of conjunctival concretion, which will make the conjunctiva cellular degeneration to produce an epithelial inclusion cyst, filled with epithelial cells and keratin debris. After calcification, the conjunctival cyst hardens and forms a conjunctival concretion. Congenital conjunctival concretion condition is also more common.

=== Clinical Statistics ===
Conjunctival concretions can be single, also multiple, less confluent. There is no difference between the site of the occurrence on the upper and lower eyelid, nor right or left eye. The vast majority of concretions are in the conjunctival surface rather than deep. There is no difference in age for predilection or incidence of concretions, due to the causes of conjunctivitis, aging, and even congenital factor.

For statistical purposes Conjunctival Concretion is classified under the World Health Organization's ICD-10 category of H11.129 and the ICD-11 category of 9A61.6.

== Treatment ==
Conjunctival concretions can be seen easily by everting the eyelid. The projecting concretions can be removed if they are causing concerning symptoms. Removal can be performed by an eye doctor. Sometimes just a needle or a scalpel is used to remove the concretion under local light anesthesia of the conjunctiva in adults.
