= Preherpetic neuralgia =

Nerve pain associated with shingles viral infection

Preherpetic neuralgia is a form of nerve pain (neuralgia) specifically associated with a Shingles (herpes zoster) viral infection. This nerve pain often precedes visible indications of a Shingles infection and consequently can be a key early indicator of a need to begin preventative anti-viral drug therapy. Pain associated with Shingles can be extremely difficult to treat whereas the source is related to the virus attacking the nervous system itself. Pain symptoms can last months or years beyond any outward sign of viral infection and can be quite severe. The combination of extreme pain severity and longevity can contribute to chronic depression and even suicide.

== See also ==
- Ramsay Hunt syndrome type 2
- Postherpetic neuralgia
