= Keratoconjunctivitis =

Inflammation of parts of the eye

- Specialty: Ophthalmology

Keratoconjunctivitis is a term used to describe inflammation of both the cornea (the clear, front part of the eye) and the conjunctiva (the thin, transparent membrane covering the white part of the eye and lining the inside of the eyelids). This condition can have various causes, and its presentation may vary depending on the underlying factors.

When only the cornea is inflamed, it is called keratitis; when only the conjunctiva is inflamed, it is called conjunctivitis.

== Causes ==
There are several potential causes of the inflammation:

- Keratoconjunctivitis sicca is used when the inflammation is due to dryness. ("Sicca" means "dryness" in medical contexts.) It occurs with 20% of rheumatoid arthritis patients.
- The term "vernal keratoconjunctivitis" (VKC) is used to refer to keratoconjunctivitis occurring in spring, and is usually considered to be due to allergens.
- "Atopic keratoconjunctivitis" is one manifestation of atopy.
- "Adenoviral keratoconjunctivitis, also known as epidemic keratoconjunctivitis, is caused by an adenovirus infection.
- "Infectious bovine keratoconjunctivitis" (IBK) is a disease affecting cattle caused by the bacteria Moraxella bovis.
- Phlyctenular keratoconjunctivitis is an inflammatory syndrome caused by a delayed (aka type-IV) hypersensitivity reaction to one or more antigens.
- "Pink eye in sheep and goat" is another infectious keratoconjunctivitis of veterinary concern, mostly caused by Chlamydophila pecorum.
- "Superior limbic keratoconjunctivitis" is thought to be caused by mechanical trauma.
- "Keratoconjunctivitis photoelectrica" (arc eye) means inflammation caused by photoelectric UV light. It is a type of ultraviolet keratitis. Such UV exposure can be caused by arc welding without wearing protective eye glass, or by high altitude exposure from sunlight reflected from snow ("snow blindness"). The inflammation will only appear after about 6 to 12 hours. It can be treated by rest, as the inflammation usually heals after 24–48 hours. Proper eye protection should be worn to prevent keratoconjunctivitis photoelectrica.

=== Viral keratoconjunctivitis ===
Keratoconjunctivitis is frequently caused by viral infections in and around the eyes. A particularly common cause of this is the herpes simplex virus. In some people, the infection may become chronic and keratoconjunctivitis may present during flare-ups of variable frequency. Over time, these can result in the corneas becoming progressively more opaque, leading to blindness.
