= Keratic precipitate =

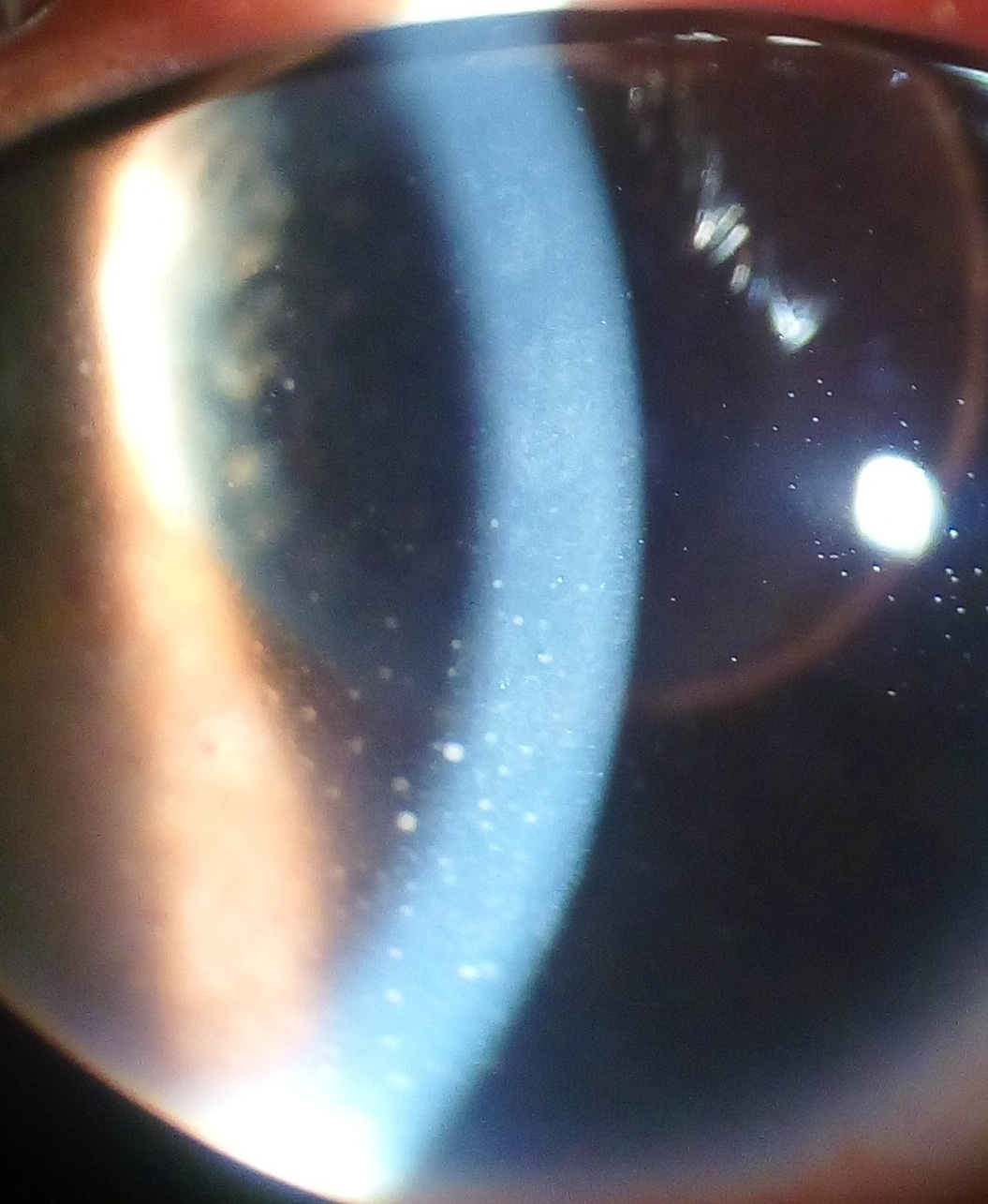
- Keratic precipitate due to Vogt-Koyanagi-Harada Disease
- Specialty: Ophthalmology

Keratic precipitate (KP) is an inflammatory cellular deposit seen on corneal endothelium. Acute KPs are white and round in shape whereas old KPs are faded and irregular in shape. Mutton-fat KPs are large in shape and are greasy-white in color and are formed from macrophages and epithelioid cells. They are indicative of inflammatory disease. Mutton fat KPs are due to granulomatous iridocyclitis. Another variant called red KPs may be seen in hemorrhagic uveitis.
