= Lagophthalmos =

Inability to close the eyes while sleeping

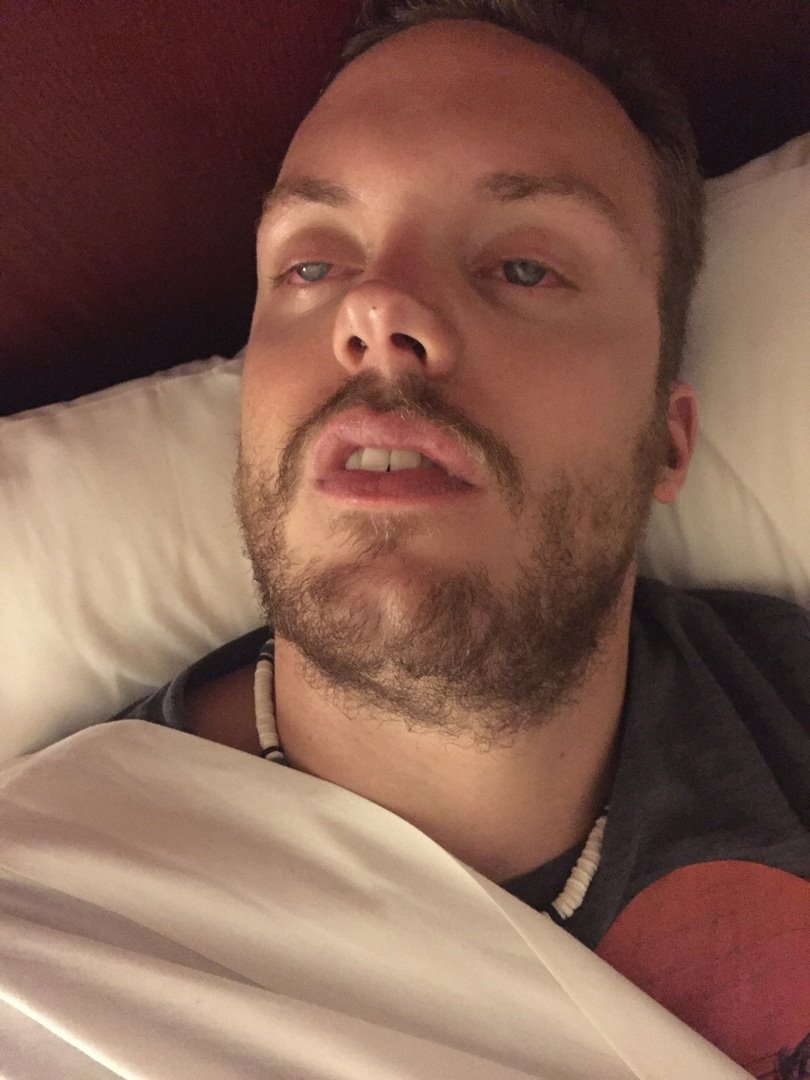
An example of lagophthalmos

Lagophthalmos is an inability to close the eyes fully.

Blinking covers the eye with a thin layer of tear fluid, thereby promoting a moist environment necessary for the cells of the exterior part of the eye. The tears also flush out foreign bodies and wash them away, which is crucial to maintain lubrication and proper eye health. If this process is impaired, as in lagophthalmos, the eye can suffer abrasions and infections; thus leading to corneal drying and ulceration.

== Types ==
Nocturnal lagophthalmos is the inability to close the eyelids during sleep. It may reduce the quality of sleep, cause exposure-related symptoms or, if severe, cause corneal damage (exposure keratopathy). The degree of lagophthalmos can be minor (obscure lagophthalmos) or quite obvious.

It is often caused by an anomaly of the eyelid that prevents full closure. Treatment may involve surgery to correct the malposition of the eyelid(s). Punctal plugs may be used to increase the amount of lubrication on the surface of the eyeball by blocking some of the tear-drainage ducts. Eye drops may also be used to provide additional lubrication or to stimulate the eyes to increase tear production.

Public awareness of the condition is not widespread; in one instance, a passenger was removed from a US Airways flight because of it.

== Pathophysiology ==
Lagophthalmos can arise from a malfunction of the facial nerve. Lagophthalmos can also occur in comatose patients having a decrease in orbicularis tone, in patients having palsy of the facial nerve (seventh cranial nerve), in people with severe exophthalmos and in people with severe skin disorders such as ichthyosis. It can also occur in patients with Grave's Ophthalmology.

Today, lagophthalmos may arise after an upper blepharoplasty, which is an operation performed to remove excessive skin overlying the upper eyelid (suprapalpebral hooding) that often occurs with aging. This can make the patient look younger, but if too much skin is removed, the appearance is unnatural and lagophthalmos may occur.

== Treatment ==
Treatment of lagophthalmos can include both supportive care methods as well as surgical options. If unable to receive surgery, patients should be administered artificial tears at least four times per day to the cornea to preserve the tear film. In preparation for surgery, a patient may undergo a tarsorrhaphy, in which the eye is partially sewn shut temporarily to further protect the cornea as the patient waits for care. Multiple surgical treatments exist for lagopthalmos, but the most prevalent method includes weighing the upper eyelid down by surgically inserting a gold plate. Because of possible complications in conjunction with both the upper and lower eyelid, a second surgery may be required to tighten and elevate the lower eyelid to ensure that both the upper and lower eyelids can fully close and protect the cornea.

== Etymology ==
The name of the condition derives from the Greek λαγώς (lagos, 'hare'), referring to the myth that hares sleep with their eyes open.
