= Punctate epithelial erosions =

- Other names: Punctate erosive keratopathy or Superficial punctate keratitis
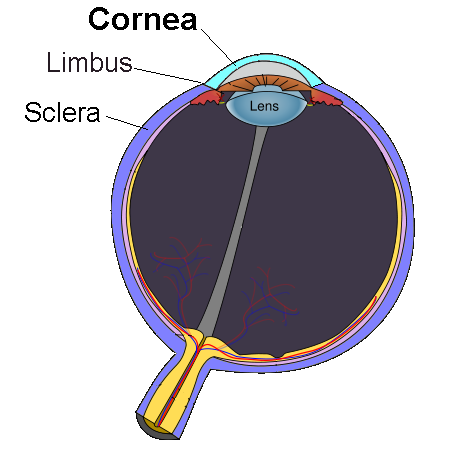
- This condition affects the cornea
- Specialty: Ophthalmology

Punctate epithelial erosions are a pathology affecting the cornea.

== Signs and symptoms ==
It is a characterized by a breakdown or damage of the epithelium of the cornea in a pinpoint pattern, which can be seen with examination with a slit-lamp. Patients may present with non-specific symptoms such as red eye, tearing, foreign body sensation, photophobia and burning.

== Cause ==
Punctate epithelial erosions may be seen with different disorders:

- Rosacea
- Dry-eye syndrome
- Blepharitis
- Acute bacterial conjunctivitis
- Trauma
- Exposure keratopathy from poor eyelid closure
- Ultraviolet or chemical burn
- Contact lens-related disorder such as toxicity or tight lens syndrome
- Trichiasis
- Entropion or ectropion
- Floppy eyelid syndrome
- Chemotherapy i.e. cytosine arabinoside
- Thygeson's Superficial Punctate Keratopathy

== Diagnosis ==
Slit lamp examination

== Treatment ==
Due to the different underlying causes, proper diagnosis, treatment, and prognosis can only be determined by an eye care professional. Punctate epithelial erosions may be treated with artificial tears. In some disorders, topical antibiotic is added to the treatment. Patients should discontinue contact lens wear until recovery.
