= Blue light spectrum =

Wavelengths of visible light

The blue light spectrum, characterized by wavelengths between 400 and 500 nanometers, has a broad impact on human health, influencing numerous physiological processes in the human body. Although blue light is essential for regulating circadian rhythms, improving alertness, and supporting cognitive function, its widespread presence has raised worries about its possible effects on general well-being.

Prolonged exposure to isolated blue light poses hazards to the well-being of the eye and may cause symptoms like dry eyes, weariness, and blurred vision. As our dependence on digital devices and artificial lighting increases, it is crucial to understand the complex pathways of the blue light spectrum that affect biological processes. To reduce the hazards of blue light exposure, effective management strategies can be implemented, including limiting screen time before bed and using blue light filter.

The blue light spectrum is an essential part of the visible spectrum with wavelengths of about 400-480 nm. Blue light is primarily generated by light-emitting diodes (LED) lighting and digital screens, it has now become prevalent in the world around us. LED lighting creates white light by combining blue light with other wavelengths, often with a yellow garnet phosphor. Blue lights from digital screens, including computers, smartphones, and tablets contribute to constant exposure throughout the day and night.

Blue light has a significant impact on numerous physiological processes in human health. The widespread use of blue light in modern technology brings up a concern about the potential consequences of excessive blue light exposure. Such exposure has been associated with disruptions in ocular health, sleep patterns, and well-being.

== Sources ==
=== Natural ===
Sunlight is the primary natural source of blue light, which is essential for regulating the circadian rhythm. Excessive exposure to sunlight without proper eye protection can lead to eye damage and cause vision issues.

=== Artificial ===
LED lighting, digital screens, and fluorescent bulbs are examples of common artificial blue light sources.

LED lighting is widely used due to its durability and energy efficiency. It emits more blue light than traditional incandescent bulbs, potentially impacting the quality of sleep and eye health if used excessively at night.

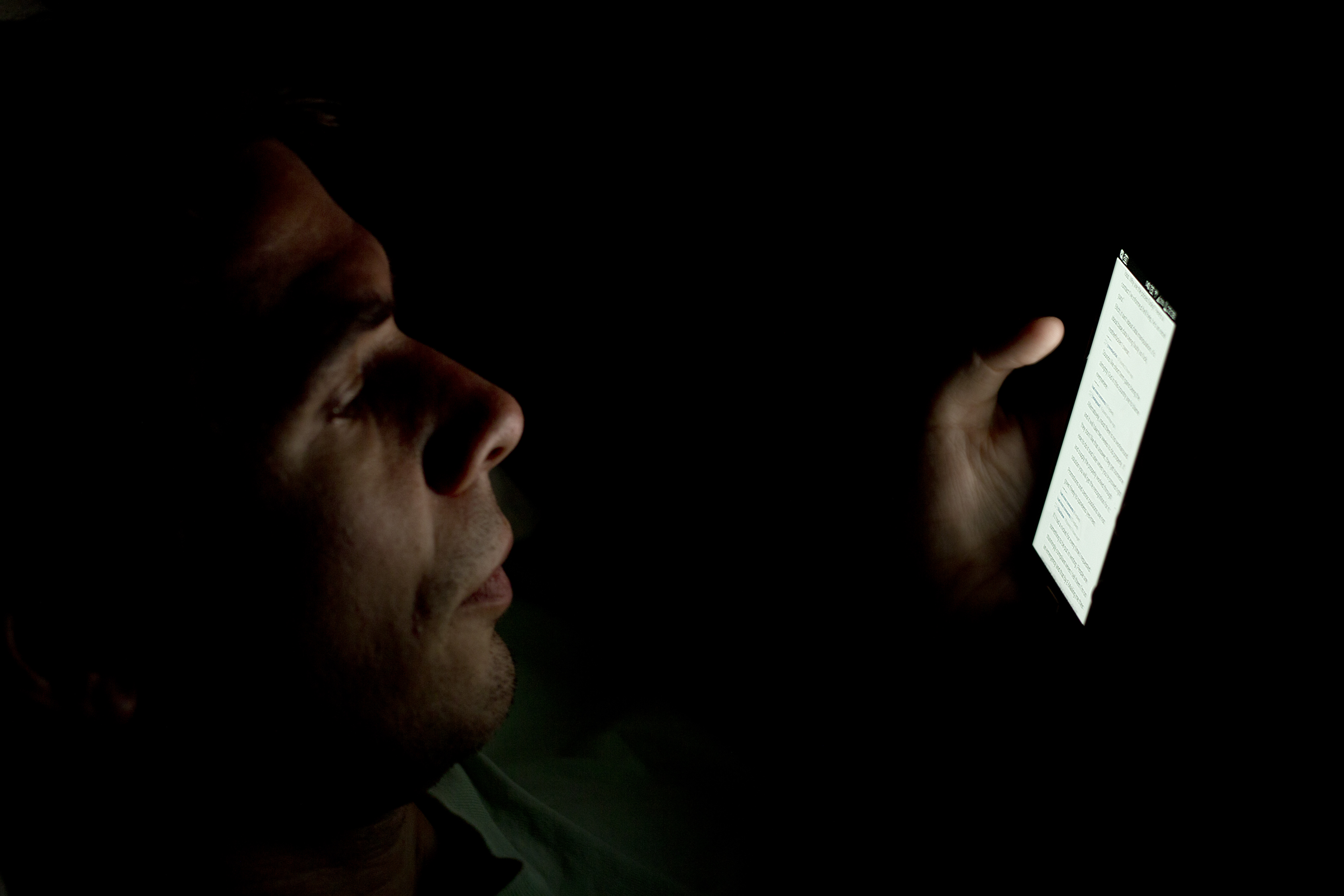
A person using a smartphone at night

Blue light is emitted by digital screens such as computers, tablets, smartphones, and televisions, which can lead to extended exposure in modern lives. Digital screen overuse, especially before bed, can cause dry eyes, eye strain, and irregular sleep patterns.

Fluorescent lighting emits blue light and is frequently used in public areas and workplaces. Long-term use of fluorescent light bulbs can cause eye strain, exhaustion, and circadian rhythm problems, especially in interior spaces with little natural light exposure.

== Mechanism ==
A labeled eye diagram.

The short wavelength and high energy of blue light make it highly effective in penetrating the human eye and inducing biological effects

=== Effects on cornea ===
The cornea is located at the front of the eyeball and serves as the initial point where light enters the eye. Blue light exposure to the cornea increases the production of reactive oxygen species (ROS), molecules in corneal epithelial cells. This activates a signalling pathway involving ROS, triggering inflammation in human corneal epithelial cells. Oxidative damage and potential cell death contribute to inflammation in the eye and the development of dry eyes.

Blue light disrupts the balance of the tear film on the cornea. Prolonged exposure to blue light leads to an increased rate of tear evaporation, resulting in dryness of the cornea and the development of dry eye syndrome.

=== Effects on lens ===
The lens is located at the entrance of the eyeball after light passes through the pupil. The lens is capable of filtering blue light, reducing retinal light damage occurrence. Blue light is absorbed by the structural proteins, enzymes, and protein metabolites found in the lens. The absorption of blue light creates yellow pigments in the lens's protein. The lens progressively darkens and turns yellow. Blue light is absorbed by the lens, preventing blue light from reaching the retina at the back of the eye. To prevent retinal damage, the lens has to lower transparency. This reaction causes visual impairment and the development of cataracts, a cloudy region in the lens.

Cumulative exposure to blue light also induces an increase in the production of ROS, free radicals, in the lens epithelial cells (hLECs) mitochondria. Accumulation of oxidative damage by free radicals in the lens contributes to the development of cataracts.

=== Effects on retina ===
The retina is a receiver of light signals and plays a crucial part in the process of visual formation. The retina is located at the back of the eye. Blue light can induce photochemical damage to the retina by passing through lenses and into the retina.

Two primary types of cells contribute to vision formation within the retina: photoreceptors (including rod and cone cells), and retinal pigment epithelium (RPE) cells. Photoreceptors are responsible for detection of light particles and convert them into detectable signals, initiating the visual process. RPE cells are located below the photoreceptor layer and maintain the integrity and functionality of the retina.

The primary cause of blue light's effects on the retina is the production of ROS that leads to oxidative stress, meaning the imbalance between the generation of harmful reactive free radicals and the body's ability to conduct detoxification. Retinal chromophores like lipofuscin and melanin absorb light energy, causing the generation of ROS and oxidative damage to retinal cells. The accumulation of oxidative stress from excessive exposure to blue light causes photochemical damage to the retina. Phototoxicity is caused by lipofuscin, which builds up inside RPE cells as a consequence of photoreceptor metabolism that is enhanced by exposure to blue light. This oxidative stress damages DNA integrity and interferes with protein homeostasis and mitochondrial activity within retinal cells, potentially contributing to disorders like cellular damage, retinal degeneration and eyesight impairment.

== Sleep disturbance ==
The circadian rhythm governs the sleep-wake cycle over a roughly 24-hour cycle, and is regulated by the suprachiasmatic nucleus (SCN) in the brain. The SCN communicates with specialised cells called intrinsically photosensitive retinal ganglion cells (ipRGCs), to synchronise the internal biological clocks with external light-dark cycles.

When ipRGCs are activated by blue light, a signalling cascade is initiated, enabling the alignment of internal biological clocks with environmental light cues. Exposure to blue light during daylight hours suppresses the secretion of melatonin, a hormone critical for circadian rhythm regulation. Melatonin is synthesised by the pineal gland, located in the middle of the brain, in response to darkness, signalling the body's transition to sleep. However, exposure to blue light at night disrupts the production and release of melatonin, leading to sleep disturbances. Melatonin is released in the blood circulation to reach target tissues in the central and peripheral regions. The amount of blue light received by ipRGCs regulates the circadian rhythm to control cycles of alertness and sleepiness. The more light stimulation, the less signals are transmitted to the pineal gland through the SCN of the hypothalamus to produce melatonin.

Blue light exposure, particularly in the evening or at night, suppresses the production and release of melatonin. When light stimulates and activates the SCN, the paraventricular nucleus (PVN) of the hypothalamus receives more signals from a neurotransmitter called GABA. GABA is an inhibitory neurotransmitter that aids in controlling neuronal activity. Both the neuronal pathway PVN and the pineal gland experience a decrease in activity as a response. This suppresses the release of melatonin. The suppression of melatonin release disrupts the body's natural circadian rhythm and interferes with the body's ability to fall asleep and achieve a restful sleep state, potentially leading to sleep disorders such as insomnia.

== Ocular health ==
The impact of blue light exposure on human health highlights the significance of reducing blue light exposure, particularly when using screens for prolonged periods of time, to protect ocular health and reduce the risk of vision-related issues.

Harmful impacts on the well-being of the eye after prolonged exposure to blue light, particularly from digital screens or fluorescent lamps, have been observed. Systematic reviews have highlighted the association between blue light exposure and digital eye strain. Digital screens emit significant amounts of blue light with shorter wavelength and higher energy compared to other visible light, which can cause symptoms such as eye fatigue, eye dryness, blurred vision, irritation, and headaches.

Blue light exposure can lead to light-induced damage to the retina, a phenomenon known as photochemical damage. When the eye is exposed to excessive levels of blue light from sources such as digital screens, a series of photochemical reactions within the retina can be stimulated. The photochemical reactions cause the production of ROS, inducing oxidative stress and damage cellular components in the eye such as ipRGCs.

== Management ==
The management of blue light exposure is crucial in preventing associated eye disorders and promoting overall well-being. People can promote healthier lifestyles, preserve eye and general health, and lessen the risk of related health problems like digital eye strain and sleep disturbances by taking these preventive measures to manage blue light exposure.

=== Limit on screen time ===
The approach of limiting screen time is effective, especially before sleep. Research has shown that a higher average screen time is correlated to eye fatigue and discomfort. Growing evidence suggests that youth physical and mental functioning may be negatively impacted by insufficient sleep, both in terms of quantity and quality. By establishing a consistent bedtime routine that includes reducing electronic device usage before sleep, it can optimise the production of melatonin, enhancing sleep quality. Stopping using digital devices an hour before bedtime has been shown to increase the quality and length of sleep.

=== Filtering lens ===
Employing blue light-blocking eyewear, such as glasses with specialised lenses, offers an additional means of protection against excessive blue light exposure, particularly for individuals with extended screen time. Studies have been conducted on blue light filtering eyeglasses, which uses special blue light blocking lenses for eye protection against blue light. All visible light wavelengths can be transmitted through the spectacle lens, but some portions of the blue-violet light spectrum are selectively attenuated by coating the specifically-designed front and posterior sides of the lens. The blue-light filtering glasses can lessen the signs of digital eye strain and prevent causing phototoxic retinal damage. There are various blue light filter options available in the current eyeglasses market at different price points.

== Digital screen use in the workplace ==
Generally, over the past five to ten years, digital screen use has increased substantially with the rise of smartphone, tablet, and computer usage. Digital screen use has dramatically increased since the COVID-19 pandemic, as at home office setups were commonly for professional reasons. Since the pandemic, these remote working solutions have remained popular, and now more than ever, people work remotely. This shift from primarily natural lighting during work/school days to a mixture of artificial blue light exposure has led researchers to look into the amount of blue light exposure people receive the health impacts caused by blue light exposure, and preventative measures that are effective in blocking blue light. Blue light exposure during daylight hours ensures that our biological needs are in balance and affects our bodies and minds in order to regulate human behavior and circadian rhythm. Overexposure to blue light can lead to harmful health effects.

=== Workplace blue light exposure ===
Office workplaces around the globe have experienced major change since March 2020. Before the COVID-19 pandemic, a typical office worker completed their daily tasks in an office setting. Meetings, conferences, and tasks could be completed in person, placing a limit on how much time workers spent doing work on their computers or phones. As more office workplaces make the switch to remote working, every aspect of their employees' jobs must be completed using technology. Those who use electronic displays everyday are exposed to greater amounts of blue lighting than people who are generally exposed to blue light at most times of day.

=== Computer vision syndrome ===
Increased exposure to blue light via digital screens can negatively impact ocular health by contributing to a condition known as Computer Vision Syndrome (CVS) or digital eye strain. CVS classifies a group of vision problems associated with computer use. About 70% of computer users are affected by CVS. Symptoms of CVS include eyestrain, headaches, blurred vision, and dry eyes. CVS is identified via comprehensive eye examination through methods such as reviewing patient history to determine risk factors, visual acuity measurements, refraction examination, and evaluating eye focus.

==== Preventative measures ====
The American Optometric Association (AOA) recommends adjusting how a computer is viewed to prevent and treat CVS. According to the American Optometric Association: "Optimally, the computer screen should be 15 to 20 degrees below eye level (about 4 or 5 inches) as measured from the center of the screen and 20-28 inches from the eyes." Reference materials should be positioned in a way so that the head does not need to reposition when looking back and forth from the document and the screen. Ideally, reference materials should be positioned above the keyboard and below the monitor. A document holder placed beside the monitor is a helpful tool to achieve this prevention measure. The computer screen in use should also be positioned in a way that it avoids glare from overhead lighting and windows. Using curtains or blinds on nearby windows, desk lamps, screen glare filters and switching overhead light bulbs to lower wattage bulbs can prevent the development of CVS.

The AOA also recommends taking rest breaks when working on computers via the 20-20-20 method. Following this method, users should take a 20 second break every 20 minutes and stare at something else 20 feet away. Blinking frequently is also recommended to prevent the development of dry eyes, as blinking helps keep the surface of the eye moist.
