= Continuous partial attention =

Modern adaptive behavior of continuously dividing one's attention

Continuous partial attention is the behavior of dividing one's attention, scanning and optimizing opportunities in an effort to not miss anything that is going on, coined in 1998 by Linda Stone. While multitasking is driven by a conscious desire to be productive, continuous partial attention is an automatic process motivated by the desire to constantly stay connected. Stone describes the reason for continuous partial attention as "a desire to be a live node on the network."

Continuous partial attention may lead to increased stress and decreased ability to focus and concentrate on the present moment, prohibiting reflection, contemplation, and thoughtful decision making. The constant connectedness that is associated with continuous partial attention may also affect relationships, lower productivity levels, and lead to overstimulation and a lack of fulfillment.

Stone's research has focused on examples in the United States though she has posited that, "We may not all find ourselves in the same attention era at the same time. We are likely to find ourselves experiencing a flow: attraction to an ideal, taking the expression of the ideal to an extreme and experiencing unintended and less than pleasant consequences, giving birth to and launching a new ideal while integrating the best of what came before."

== Consequences of continuous partial attention ==
=== Neuro-cognitive impact ===
Rapidly switching between tasks impairs working memory capacity and results in poor performance on learning tasks. Diminished working memory capacity causes inattentiveness and lead to learning difficulties. Weaker cognitive flexibility and less creative thinking are observed in individuals engaging in continuous partial attention. This results in difficulties with refocusing point of view or changing perspectives in response to new information. The chronic presence of this condition may hamper the neuroplasticity of the brain and potentially weaken cognitive function over time.

=== Impact on decision making ===
Continuous partial attention causes humans to continuously access information. When cognitive resources are depleted in processing the surplus of information from partaking in multiple tasks, humans tend to pick the safer options that are less optimal. Continuous partial attention makes people more risk-averse compared to focusing on a single task as the overload of information reduces our ability to critically evaluate our choices.The ambiguity from our poor assessment makes us resort to a safer choice. In this manner, human objectivity is hampered during decision-making attributable to continuous partial attention.

=== Impact on collaboration ===
Building rapport requires teamwork and communication. Reduced active listening can lead to misunderstandings, misinterpretations and barriers to communication. Studies showed that students reporting higher media multitasking scored significantly lower on a listening comprehension test. The research found that team members engaging in higher levels of continuous partial attention reported lower levels of team effectiveness and satisfaction. In this way, it hinders the ability to build trust and work effectively in a team. Continuous partial attention leads to a short temper and decreased patience in a team setting due to frustration and cognitive strain.

=== Workplace productivity ===
A negative correlation has been observed between continuous partial attention and workplace productivity. Disruption of deep cognitive processing due to fragmented attention leads to overlooking finer details, greater error rates, and longer completion times. Another consequence of continuous partial attention is the fear of missing out (FOMO), which generates a compulsive need to work beyond the expected working hours, leading to reduced personal recovery time and poor sleep.This leads to the formation of a cycle, as poor recovery and sleep deprivation exacerbates difficulties with focus.

=== Impact on personal well-being ===
Bifurcation of focus in multiple information streams and tasks ultimately leads to employee stress and a poor work-life balance. An increasing need to be perpetually available in professional settings causes difficulty in distinguishing between professional and personal spheres. This leads to more frequent and intense burnout and affects mental and physical health. The constant pressure to stay connected leads to stress. Individuals with increased interruptions of information or tasks had higher levels of cortisol. Participants with high levels of continuous partial attention struggled to regulate negative emotions, resulting in feelings of frustration and overwhelm. A correlation is observed between high levels of anxiety and depression and continuous partial attention.

Continuous partial attention leads to the formation of a vicious cycle. Actively and constantly trying to eliminate distractions and focus leads to cognitive fatigue and a reduced sense of control in work environments. This lack of control results in stress, which triggers the release of cortisol. Effects of cortisol include irritability and difficulty sleeping, impacting overall well-being. This hampers the ability to effectively regulate emotions, leading to negative consequences like social withdrawal and outbursts. The feelings of dissatisfaction with people's performance at work, coupled with subpar productivity, perpetuate the cycle.

== Strategies to mitigate the effect of continuous partial attention ==
A method to combat task switching and decrease productivity is Timeblocking. Dedicating specific time to tasks has proven to increase overall productivity and reduce task switching. The inclusion of the Pomodoro technique, or scheduling timed work in a distraction-free environment, encourages continual concentration on tasks. Digital detoxing significantly reduces stress and increases well-being by disconnecting from digital distractions and reducing the cognitive overload it causes.

A study showed that the use of mindfulness apps and meditation leads to an increase in sustained attention, so the implementation of apps that offer guided meditation as well as notification blockers can be used to improve browsing habits, ultimately promoting focus. Organisations can optimise user interface design to increase user focus, like blocking the use of specific tabs on social media platforms. They can also keep designated distraction-free zones to encourage social connection and reduce stress ultimately resulting in deeper focus.

== Further research ==
Cognitive training and attention control exercises are being developed to improve attention. Most of the solutions to counter continuous partial attention reduce the effect rather than reducing the problem itself. Using brain-training games has seen promising results in increasing cognitive control and reducing susceptibility to distractions. Due to the fast-changing media landscape, the extent to which attention is fragmented keeps evolving, which requires solutions of increasing intensity to reduce continuous partial attention. Future developments will focus on increasing the focus-enhancing toolbox as well as the genetic and physiological implications of continuous partial attention.
