= Cognitive shifting =

Process of consciously redirecting attention from one fixation to another

Cognitive shifting is the mental process of consciously redirecting one's attention from one fixation to another. In contrast, if this process happened unconsciously, then it is referred to as task switching. Both are forms of cognitive flexibility.

In the general framework of cognitive therapy and awareness management, cognitive shifting refers to the conscious choice to take charge of one's mental habits—and redirect one's focus of attention in helpful, more successful directions. In the term's specific usage in corporate awareness methodology, cognitive shifting is a performance-oriented technique for refocusing attention in more alert, innovative, charismatic and empathic directions.

== Origins in cognitive therapy ==
In cognitive therapy, as developed by its founder Aaron T. Beck and others, a client is taught to shift his or her cognitive focus from one thought or mental fixation to a more positive, realistic focus—thus the descriptive origins of the term "cognitive shifting". In "third wave" ACT therapy as taught by Steven C. Hayes and his associates in the Acceptance and Commitment Therapy movement, cognitive shifting is employed not only to shift from negative to positive thoughts, but also to shift into a quiet state of mindfulness. Cognitive shifting is also employed quite dominantly in the meditative-health procedures of medical and stress-reduction researchers such as Jon Kabat-Zinn at the University of Massachusetts Medical School.

Gradually over the 1990's and 2000's, cognitive shifting has become a common term among therapists especially on the West Coast, as well as in discussions of mind management methodology, and has begun to regularly appear in medical and psychiatric journals.

== Examples of usage ==
In research: The term has become fairly common in psychiatric research, used in the following manner: "Neuropsychological findings in obsessive-compulsive disorder (OCD) have been explained in terms of reduced cognitive shifting ability as a result of low levels of frontal inhibitory activity."

In therapy: In therapy (as in the work of Steven Hayes and associates), a client is taught first to identify and accept a negative thought or attitude, and then to allow the cognitive shifting process to re-direct attention away from the negative fixation, toward a chosen aim or goal that is more positive—thus the "accept and choose act" from whence comes the ACT therapy name. Cognitive studies of the elderly refer to "...Impaired cognitive shifting in Parkinsonian patients on anticholinergic therapy..." etc.

Everyday usage: Books such as The Way Of The Tiger by Lance Secretan, and The Creative Manager by Peter Russell have suggested how cognitive shifting principles apply to everyday life. Decades ago Rollo May taught the process of conscious choosing and cognitive shifting at Princeton in his psychology lectures. And in books such as The Emotional Brain, Joseph LeDoux attempted to clarify the power of consciously shifting from a negative to a more positive emotional focus. In John Selby's writings, most notable in Quiet Your Mind, the term appears frequently.

In meditation: Among the first references to the general mental process of focal shifting or cognitive shifting (the term cognitive is a relatively new term), the Hindu Upanishads are probably the first written documentation of the meditative process of redirecting one's focus of attention in particular disciplined directions. Cognitive shifting is the core process of all meditation, especially in Kundalini meditation but also in Zen meditation and even in Christian mysticism where the mind's attention is re-directed (or shifted) toward particular theologically-determined focal points. Recent books have spoken directly of cognitive shifting as a meditative procedure.

== Specific term roots ==
In a recent NPR interview with Michael Toms, and elsewhere in his writings, John Selby attributes his initial introduction to the process of cognitive shifting to Jiddu Krishnamurti, whom he considers his early spiritual teacher, and also to his training with Rollo May at Princeton. In the NPR interview, Selby says he is almost certain that he first heard the actual term from a lecture by the 1960s philosopher Alan Watts during his "Expanding Christianity" lectures at the San Francisco Theological Seminary in 1972.

== Focus phrase methodology ==
The primary cognitive technology that is used for cognitive shifting is called "focus phrase" methodology. This term has emerged from the actual process in which cognitive shifting is encouraged or even provoked in a client or any other person. The person states clear intent through a specially-worded focus phrase—and then experiences the inner shift that the focus phrase elicits.

Another term sometimes used for focus phrases is "elicitor statements". In some methodologies focus phrases are said as a set of 4 to 7 statements, fairly quickly and to oneself. In other techniques a single focus phrase is held in the mind during a whole morning or day, and perhaps changed each new day during the week.

== See also ==
- Alexander Lowen
- Rollo May
- Mindfulness (Buddhism) Meditation
- Perceptual Psychology
- Flow (psychology)
- Hyperfocus
- Jhana
- Thought stopping
