= Crossmodal attention =

Crossmodal attention refers to the distribution of attention to different senses. Attention is the cognitive process of selectively emphasizing and ignoring sensory stimuli. According to the crossmodal attention perspective, attention often occurs simultaneously through multiple sensory modalities. These modalities process information from the different sensory fields, such as: visual, auditory, spatial, and tactile. While each of these is designed to process a specific type of sensory information, there is considerable overlap between them which has led researchers to question whether attention is modality-specific or the result of shared "cross-modal" resources. Cross-modal attention is considered to be the overlap between modalities that can both enhance and limit attentional processing. The most common example given of crossmodal attention is the cocktail party effect, which is when a person is able to focus and attend to one important stimulus instead of other less important stimuli. This phenomenon allows deeper levels of processing to occur for one stimulus while others are then ignored.

A primary concern for cognitive psychologists researching attention is to determine whether directing attention to one specific sensory modality occurs at the expense of others. Previous research has often examined how directing attention to different modalities can affect the efficiency of performance in various tasks. Studies have found that the interplay between attentional modalities exists at the neurological level providing evidence for the influences of cross-modal attention. However a greater number of studies have emphasized the deficits in attention caused by the shifting between modalities.

== Deficits caused by crossmodal attention ==
As cross-modal attention requires attending to two or more types of sensory information simultaneously, attentional resources are typically divided unequally. It has been suggested by most research that this divided attention can result in more attentional deficits than benefits. This has raised the question as to the effectiveness of multitasking and the potential dangers associated with it. Significant amounts of delay in reaction times are present when various distractions across modalities occur. In real-life situations these slower reaction times can result in dangerous situations. Recent concerns in the media on this topic revolve around the topic of cellphone usage while driving. Studies have found that processing, and therefore attending to, auditory information can impair the simultaneous processing of visual information. This suggests that attending to the auditory information from cellphone usage while driving will impair a driver's visual attention and ability to drive. This would result in the endangering of the driver, passengers of the driver, pedestrians, and other drivers and their passengers. Similar studies have examined how visual attention is affected by auditory stimuli as it relates to hemispatial neglect, responses to cuing, and general spatial processing. The majority of this research suggests that multitasking and dividing attention, while possible, degrade the quality of the directed attention. This also suggests that attention is a limited resource that cannot be infinitely divided between modalities and tasks.

== Benefits ==
While research on cross-modal attention has found that deficits in attending often occur, this research has led to a better understanding of attentional processing. Some studies have used positron emission tomography (PET) to examine the neurological basis for how we selectively attend to information using different sensory modalities. Event related potentials (ERPs). have also been used to help researchers measure how humans encode and process attended information in the brain. By increasing our understanding of modality-specific and cross-modal attention, we are better able to understand how we think and direct our attention.

In addition to greater general understanding of attention, other benefits of crossmodal attention have been found. Studies show that reinforcing information through more than one modality can increase learning. This would support the traditional theory that pairing auditory and visual stimuli that communicate the same information improves processing and memory.

== See also ==
- Attention
- Cocktail party effect
- Cognition
- Crossmodal
- Distraction
- Human multitasking
- Mobile phones and driving safety
- Perception
- Psychology
- Stimulus modality
