= SCAN =

Group of psychological measurements

Schedules for Clinical Assessment in Neuropsychiatry (SCAN) is a set of tools created by WHO aimed at diagnosing and measuring mental illness that may occur in adult life. It is not constructed explicitly for use with either ICD-10 or DSM-IV but can be used for both systems. The SCAN system was originally called PSE, or Present State Examination, but since version 10 (PSE-10), the commonly accepted name has been SCAN. The current version of SCAN is 2.1.

== Interview items ==
The entire SCAN interview consists of 1,872 items, spread out over 28 sections. Most patients, however, will only need parts of the interview, and it is assessed in the beginning of each section if the section is actually relevant. The sections are as follows:

=== Section 0 - Face sheet and sociodemographic items ===
The first section in the SCAN interview is concerned with sociodemographic items such as age, gender, education, etc.

=== Section 1 - Beginning the Interview ===
In section 1 (the second section), the interviewer starts to ask the respondent or patient about what kinds of symptoms has been experienced. This section is not used in diagnosis, but it is intended as a help for the interviewer to determine which items in the interview to emphasize on. As such, it is a screening tool for part 1 of the interview (sections 2 to 13).

=== Section 2 - Somatoform and dissociative symptoms ===
Section 2 is primarily centered on somatoform and dissociative symptoms and is rated both by using direct questions and by observing the patient.

=== Section 3 - Worrying, tension, etc. ===
Section 3 explores the degree of worrying and tension in the patient, by direct questions about feelings of worrying, nervous tension, muscular tension, fatiguability, noise sensitivity, etc.

=== Section 4 - Panic, Anxiety and phobias ===
Section 4 measures the degree and physiological reactions associated with potential anxiety attacks and phobias, including behaviour in which situations are avoided due to phobias. Fear of dying and generalized anxiety disorder are also measured.

=== Section 5 - Obsessional symptoms ===
Section 5 explores, by direct questions, whether the respondent experiences behaviour characteristic of OCD.

=== Section 6 - Depressed mood and ideation ===
Section 6 measures, by direct questions, whether the respondent is depressed, by items relating to feeling low, uncontrolled crying, anhedonia, loss of feeling, suicidal tendencies, social withdrawal, insomnia or hypersomnia, dysthymia, etc.

=== Section 7 - Thinking, concentration, energy, interest ===
Section 7 measures cognitive functioning through direct questions about concentration, loss of interests or drive, and being overwhelmed by everyday tasks.

=== Section 8 - Bodily functions ===
Section 8 asks direct questions about weight and weight gain or loss, appetite, sleep patterns, and libido.

=== Section 9 - Eating disorders ===
Section 9 aims to diagnose eating disorders such as bulimia and anorexia nervosa.

=== Section 10 - Expansive mood and ideation ===
Section 10 measures whether the respondent experiences euphoria or abnormally elevated mood (mania), which can be used in diagnosing, for instance, bipolar disorders.

=== Section 11 - Use of alcohol ===
Section 11 measures, through direct questions, amounts of alcoholic beverages consumed and social, legal, physical, and other problems related to alcohol use.

=== Section 12 - Use of psychoactive substances other than alcohol ===
Section 12 measures, again through direct questions, the same as section 11, only relating to prescription drugs, illicit drugs, and nicotine.

=== Section 13 - Interference and attributions for part one ===
This section is rated by the interviewer based on the clinical picture of the interview and the patient in general, and is thus not completed by using direct questions.

=== Section 14 - Screen for items in part two ===
Just like section 1, section 14 is used for screening the existence of symptoms, in this case for part 2 of the SCAN interview which focuses on psychotic symptoms.

=== Section 15 - Language problems at examination ===
In this section, the interviewer rates the existence of any language problems that makes conducting the interview impossible. Many of the other sections provide options for rating that assessment of individual items is impossible because of the presence of language problems recorded in section 15.

=== Section 16 - Perceptual disorders other than hallucinations ===
Section 16 measures, through direct questions, whether non-hallucinatory perceptual disorders are present. These may present themselves by the respondents stating to have experiences of their surroundings being distorted, or unreal (derealization), or that they themselves are not real, but more like characters in a play (depersonalization). Experiences such as believing that one's reflection is unrecognizable, or that one's appearance has been changed, are also rated here.

=== Section 17 - Hallucinations ===
In this section, the respondent is asked about the experience of hallucinations, be they visual, auditory (verbal or non-verbal), olfactory, tactile, or sexual.

=== Section 18 - Experiences of thought interference and replacement of will ===
Section 18 measures the existence and type of thought interference. These include the respondents' thoughts being read, loud (i.e. having voice-like sound), echoing, being broadcast, or even stolen. Experiences of thought being inserted into the respondents' minds are also rated here, as is the experience of thought stopping, involuntarily, as suddenly as a TV becoming unplugged. Alternate lines of thought, that don't belong to the respondent but that comment on the respondents thoughts, are rated as well. So is the experience of external forces (e.g. other people) controlling the respondents' will, voice, handwriting, actions, or affect.

=== Section 19 - Delusions ===
Delusions of being spied upon, and other paranoid delusions, are rated by direct questions in this section. Other types of delusions covered in this section include others not being who they claim to be, that people close to the respondent have been replaced with lookalikes, and delusions of conspiracy. Furthermore, hypochondrial delusions, and grandiose delusions, etc., are rated by the interviewer.

=== Section 20 - Further information for classification of Part 2 symptoms ===
This section is fully rated by the interviewer after the interview, and deals with aspects of duration and course of schizophrenia and psychosis and other symptoms rated in part 2 of the SCAN interview.

=== Section 21 - Cognitive impairment and decline ===
This section consists of a series of tests to be conducted by the respondent to establish the presence of cognitive impairment such as dementia. The majority of the section consists of a Mini-Mental State Examination (MMSE). This includes testing the respondents' ability to know where they are, what the date and year is, to remember words, to follow instructions, attention, and concentration.

=== Section 22 - Motor and behavioral items ===
This section is rated by the interviewer based on observing the respondents, or consulting their medical charts. A variety of items are assessed, including underactivity, stupor, distractibility, agitation, ambitendence, echopraxia, embarrassing or bizarre behavior, histrionic behavior, self injury, hoarding of objects, and a variety of negative symptoms.

== See also ==
- Diagnostic classification and rating scales used in psychiatry
