= Computer glasses =

Computer glasses may refer to:

- Blue-light blocking glasses, to try to reduce eyestrain from computer use
- Smartglasses, glasses with computer technology
  - Google Glass, major brand

== See also ==
- Computer vision syndrome
- Sunglasses
