= Human multitasking =

Ability to perform activities simultaneously

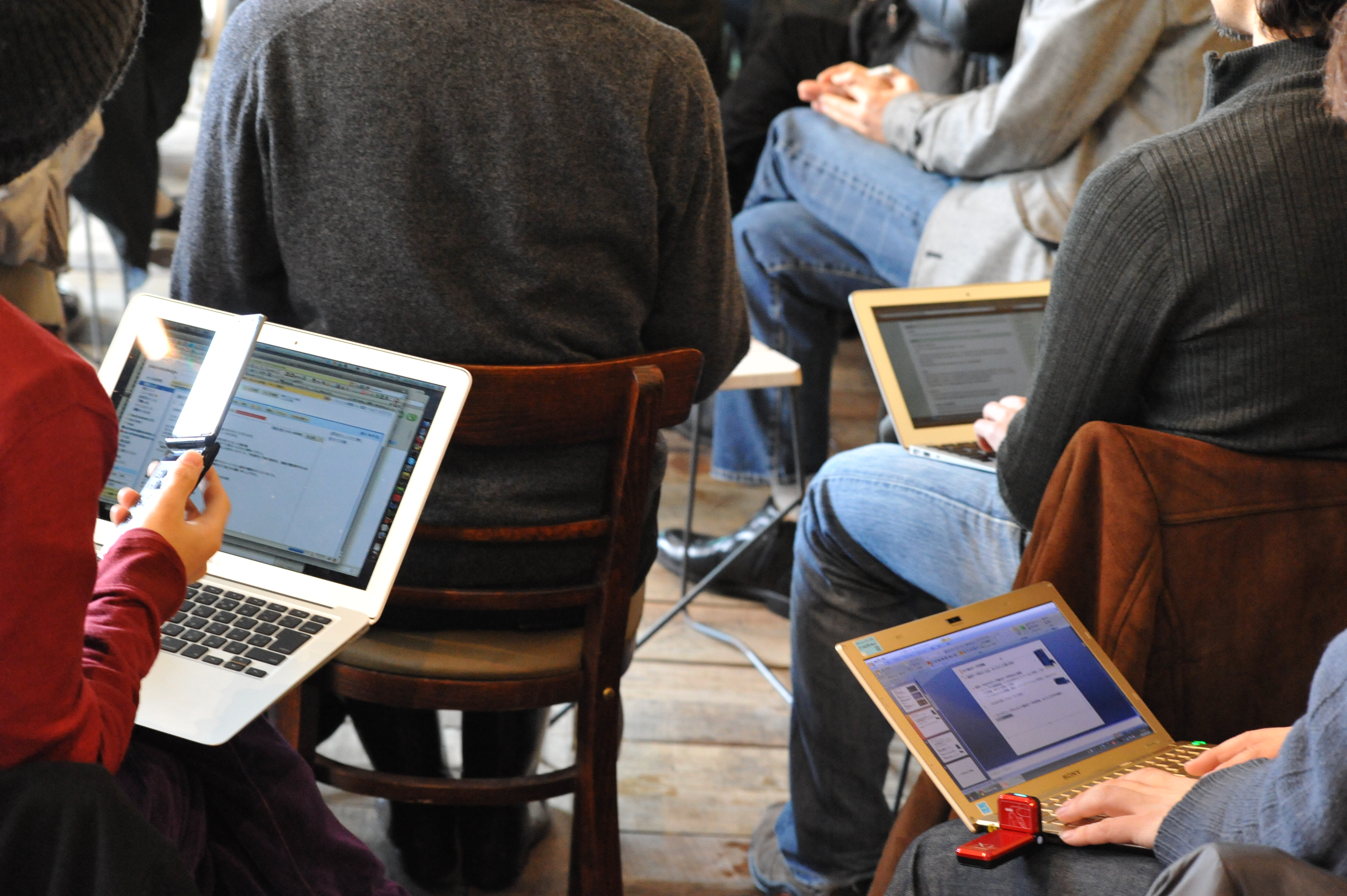
A person simultaneously making use of a laptop and mobile phone

Human multitasking is a concept that one can split their attention on more than one task or activity at the same time, such as speaking on the phone while driving a car.

Multitasking can result in time wasted due to human context switching (e.g., determining which step is next in the task just switched to) and becoming prone to errors due to insufficient attention. Some people may be proficient at the tasks in question, able to rapidly shift attention between the tasks, and thus able to perform the tasks well. However, self-perception of being good at multitasking or getting more done while multitasking is frequently inaccurate.

Multitasking is mentally and physically stressful for everyone, to the point that multitasking is used in laboratory experiments to study stressful environments. Research suggests that people who are multitasking in a learning environment are worse at learning new information compared to those who do not have their attention divided among different tasks.

== Etymology ==
The first published use of the word "multitask" appeared in an IBM paper describing the capabilities of the IBM System/360 in 1965. The term has since been applied to human tasks.

== Research ==
Since the 1960s, psychologists have conducted experiments on the nature and limits of human multitasking. The simplest experimental design used to investigate human multitasking is the so-called psychological refractory period effect. Here, people are asked to make separate responses to each of two stimuli presented close together in time. An extremely general finding is a slowing in responses to the second-appearing stimulus. This slowing is intuitively apparent even in certain simple game-like contexts.

Researchers have long suggested that there appears to be a processing bottleneck preventing the brain from working on certain key aspects of both tasks at the same time (e.g., (Gladstones, Regan & Lee 1989) (Pashler 1994)). Bottlenecking refers to the idea that because people only have a limited amount of attentional resources, the most important information is kept. Many researchers believe that the cognitive function subject to the most severe form of bottlenecking is the planning of actions and retrieval of information from memory. Psychiatrist Edward M. Hallowell has gone so far as to describe multitasking as a "mythical activity in which people believe they can perform two or more tasks simultaneously as effectively as one."

Others have researched multitasking in the area of learning. Richard E Mayer and Roxana Moreno studied the phenomenon of cognitive load in multimedia learning and concluded that it is difficult, if not impossible, to learn new information while engaging in multitasking. Reynol Junco (and Shelia R Cotten ) examined how multitasking affects academic success and found that students who engaged in high levels of multitasking reported significant issues with their academic work. A more recent study on the effects of multitasking on academic performance showed that using Facebook and text messaging while studying were negatively related to student grades, while online searching and emailing were not.

Some experiments have been done that demonstrate that it is possible to divide one's attention among several tasks; how successfully depends on several factors such as how much practice one has with it or the difficulty of the task. Walter Schneider and Robert Shiffrin performed an experiment in which they presented the participants with a memory set, which consisted of target stimuli such as the number three. After being presented with the memory set they were rapidly shown 20 test frames that contained distractor stimuli. One of the slides they were shown contained one of the target stimuli from the memory set. With each trial, a new memory set and new test frames were presented. At the start of the experiment, participants averaged 55% in correctly identifying the target stimuli from the memory set. After 900 trials the participants were able to bring the average up to 90%. They reported that after about 600 trials the task became automatic and they were able to respond without thinking about it.

=== The brain's role ===
Because the brain cannot fully focus when multitasking, people take longer to complete tasks and are predisposed to error. When people attempt to complete many tasks at one time, "or [alternate] rapidly between them, errors go way up, and it takes far longer—often double the time or more—to get the jobs done than if they were done sequentially," states Meyer. This is largely because "the brain is compelled to restart and refocus". A study by Meyer and David Kieras found that in the interim between each exchange, the brain makes no progress whatsoever. Therefore, multitasking people not only perform each task less suitably, but lose time in the process.

According to a study done by Jordan Grafman, chief of the cognitive neuroscience section at the National Institute of Neurological Disorders and Stroke, "the most anterior part [of the brain] allows [a person] to leave something when it's incomplete and return to the same place and continue from there," while Brodmann Area 10, a part of the brain's frontal lobes, is important for establishing and attaining long-term goals. Focusing on multiple dissimilar tasks at once forces the brain to process all activity in its anterior. Though the brain is complex and can perform myriad tasks, it cannot multitask well.

Another study by René Marois, a psychologist at Vanderbilt University, discovered that the brain exhibits a "response selection bottleneck" when asked to perform several tasks at once. The brain must then decide which activity is most important, thereby taking more time. Psychologist David Meyer, of the University of Michigan, claims that instead of a "bottleneck," the brain experiences "adaptive executive control" which places priorities on each activity. These viewpoints differ in that while bottlenecking attempts to force many thoughts through the brain at once, adaptive executive control prioritizes tasks to maintain a semblance of order. The brain better understands this order and, as psychologists such as Dr. Meyer believe, can, therefore, be trained to multitask. It is not known exactly how the brain processes input and reacts to overstimulation.

More recent neuroimaging research suggests that multitasking performance depends not only on how the brain prioritizes competing tasks, but also on how distinctly those tasks are represented in the brain. Using functional magnetic resonance imaging (fMRI) and Multivoxel pattern analysis (MVPA), researchers found that greater overlap between neural representations of concurrent tasks was associated with increased multitasking interference, whereas practice reduced this overlap and improved performance, suggesting that learning helps the brain maintain more distinct representations of competing tasks.

Further research supports that the human brain can be trained to multitask. A study published in Child Development by Monica Luciana, associate professor of psychology at the University of Minnesota, discovered that the brain's capability of categorizing competing information continues to develop until ages sixteen and seventeen. A study by Vanderbilt University found that multitasking is largely limited by "the speed with which our prefrontal cortex processes information." Paul E. Dux, the co-author of the study, believes that this process can become faster through proper training. The study trained seven people to perform two simple tasks, either separately or together, and conducted brain scans of the participants. The individuals multitasked poorly at first but, with training, were able to adeptly perform the tasks simultaneously. Brain scans of the participants indicate that the prefrontal cortex quickened its ability to process the information, enabling the individuals to multitask more efficiently. However, the study also suggests that the brain is incapable of performing multiple tasks at one time, even after extensive training. This study further indicates that, while the brain can become adept at processing and responding to certain information, it cannot truly multitask.

People have a limited ability to retain information, which worsens when the amount of information increases. For this reason, people alter information to make it more memorable, such as separating a ten-digit phone number into three smaller groups or dividing the alphabet into sets of three to five letters, a phenomenon known as chunking. George Miller, former psychologist at Harvard University, believes the limits to the human brain's capacity centers around "the number seven, plus or minus two." An illustrative example of this is a test in which a person must repeat numbers read aloud. While two or three numbers are easily repeated, fifteen numbers become more difficult. The person would, on average, repeat seven correctly. Brains are only capable of storing a limited amount of information in their short-term memories.

Laboratory-based studies of multi-tasking indicate that one motivation for switching between tasks is to increase the time spent on the task that produces the most reward (Payne, Duggan & Neth, 2007). This reward could be progress towards an overall task goal, or it could simply be the opportunity to pursue a more interesting or fun activity. Payne, Duggan, and Neth (2007) found that decisions to switch task reflected either the reward provided by the current task or the availability of a suitable opportunity to switch (i.e. the completion of a subgoal). A French fMRI study published in 2010 indicated preliminary support for the hypothesis that the brain can pursue at most two goals simultaneously, one for each frontal lobe (which has a goal-oriented area).

When studying the costs of multitasking there are typically two designs for or types of multitasking that are examined: task switching and dual tasking. Task switching involves shifting one's attention from one thing to another. Dual tasking, on the other hand, is when attention is divided among multiple things at once. Studies have been done to specifically examine the brain when one is engaged in either type of multitasking. Through the use of MRI brain scans, researchers have found that frontoparietal regions are activated which would include the inferior frontal junction and the posterior parietal cortex. They also found that while each type of tasking uses different mechanisms there are also some underlying mechanisms and resources that they share.

The difficulty of multitasking can also depend on the combination of tasks being performed. Some tasks pair information with responses in relatively natural ways. For example, a person might respond to something they see by pressing a button, while responding to something they hear by speaking aloud. These combinations tend to interfere less with each other because the tasks use different types of sensory information and responses. When these pairings are reversed, such as responding verbally to something seen while making a physical response to something heard, the tasks can interfere more strongly with each other, resulting in slower responses and more errors.

=== Sex differences ===
Although some cultures believe that women are better at multitasking than men, there is little data available to support claims of a real sex difference. Most studies that do show any sex differences tend to find that the differences are small and inconsistent.

In 2013, a brain connectivity study from Penn Medicine found major differences in men and women's neural wiring that researchers suggested indicated that sex plays a role in multitasking skills. They said that "[On] average, men are more likely better at learning and performing a single task at hand, like cycling or navigating directions, whereas women have superior memory and social cognition skills, making them more equipped for multitasking and creating solutions that work for a group." However, this study has been widely criticized because the differences could easily have been caused by increased head movement. Moreover, the link between the DTI data and behavioral performance is speculative.

In 2018, a study in Norway tested everyday scenarios via video games and found that "none of the multitasking measures (accuracy, total time, total distance covered by the avatar, a prospective memory score, and a distractor management score) showed any sex differences."

A 2019 study showed that there are no significant sex differences in multitasking across numerous tasks.

There have been attempts to produce evolutionary explanations for the popular belief. One story told by evolutionary biologists Silverman and Eals speculated that a sex-based division of labor into hunters and gatherers could favor the development of a difference in men and women's cognitive abilities, based on the hunter-gatherer tasks each sex performed in the prehistoric past. This is based on the outdated belief that prehistoric men were hunters, while women were gatherers and took care of the children, and that over time, there was a natural selection for women who could multitask, resulting in modern females being superior multitaskers. However, an attempted verification of this study found "that multiple methodological failures all bias their results in the same direction...their analysis does not contradict the wide body of empirical evidence for gendered divisions of labor in foraging societies".

=== Continuous partial attention ===
Author Steven Berlin Johnson describes one kind of multitasking: "It usually involves skimming the surface of the incoming data, picking out the relevant details, and moving on to the next stream. You're paying attention, but only partially. That lets you cast a wider net, but it also runs the risk of keeping you from really studying the fish." Multimedia pioneer Linda Stone coined the phrase "continuous partial attention" for this kind of processing. Continuous partial attention is multitasking where things do not get studied in depth.

Rapidly increasing technology fosters multitasking because it promotes multiple sources of input at a given time. Instead of exchanging old equipment like TV, print, and music, for new equipment such as computers, the Internet, and video games, children and teens combine forms of media and continually increase sources of input. According to studies by the Kaiser Family Foundation, in 1999 only 16 percent of the time spent using media such as the Internet, television, video games, telephones, text-messaging, or e-mail was combined. In 2005, 26 percent of the time these media were used together. This increase in simultaneous media usage decreases the amount of attention paid to each device. In 2005 it was found that 82 percent of American youth use the Internet by the seventh grade in school. A 2005 survey by the Kaiser Family Foundation found that, while their usage of media continued at a constant 6.5 hours per day, Americans ages 8 to 18 were crowding roughly 8.5 hours' worth of media into their days due to multitasking. The survey showed that one quarter to one-third of the participants have more than one input "most of the time" while watching television, listening to music, or reading. The 2007 Harvard Business Review featured Linda Stone's idea of "continuous partial attention," or, "constantly scanning for opportunities and staying on top of contacts, events, and activities in an effort to miss nothing". As technology provides more distractions, attention is spread among tasks more thinly.

A prevalent example of this inattention to detail due to multitasking is apparent when people talk on cell phones while driving. One study found that having an accident is four times more likely when using a cell phone while driving. Another study compared reaction times for experienced drivers during a number of tasks, and found that the subjects reacted more slowly to brake lights and stop signs during phone conversations than during other simultaneous tasks. A 2006 study showed that drivers talking on cell phones were more involved in rear-end collisions and sped up more slowly than intoxicated drivers. When talking, people must withdraw their attention from the road to formulate responses. Because the brain cannot focus on two sources of input at one time, driving and listening or talking, constantly changing input provided by cell phones distracts the brain and increases the likelihood of accidents.

=== Supertasker ===
In 2010, a scientific study found that a small percent of the population appeared to be much better at multitasking than others, and these people were subsequently labeled "supertaskers". In 2015, another study supported the idea of supertaskers. This particular study showed that they tested people by making them drive on a driving simulator while at the same time memorizing words and solving math problems. As expected, most of the participants did much worse than their individual task test scores. The supertaskers, however, were able to multitask without major effects on their performance.

== Popular commentary on practical multitasking ==
Barry Schwartz has noted that, given the media-rich landscape of the Internet era, it is tempting to get into a habit of dwelling in a constant sea of information with too many choices, which has been noted to have a negative effect on human happiness.

Observers of youth in modern society often comment upon the apparently advanced multitasking capabilities of Millennials, Generation Z. While contemporary researchers find that these generations exhibit high levels of multitasking, studies show that they are not any better at multitasking than members of older generations. However, some studies from the 2010s argue that Millennials are becoming better at media multitasking. Media multitasking is when media consumers view several media platforms at the same time, such as watching TV while browsing the internet. This is evidenced by the fact that they are gaining control over deciding which messages they pay attention to or not. Nonetheless, while there is a great deal of evidence showing the negative effects of multitasking on cognitive tasks, there is no evidence showing that multitasking has a positive or neutral effect on these tasks.

Many studies, literature, articles, and worldwide consulting firms, stress the fact that multitasking of any kind reduces the productivity and/or increases rate of errors, thus generating unnecessary frustrations.

In 2008, it was estimated that $650 billion a year is wasted in US businesses due to multitasking.

== See also ==
- Absent-mindedness
- Attention management
- Crossmodal attention
- Directed attention fatigue
- Human reliability
- Media multitasking
- Multi-boxing
- Ovsiankina effect
- Pareto principle
- Parkinson's Law
- Polychronicity
- Task switching (psychology)
- Time management
