= Raster burn =

Raster burn may refer to:

- Phosphor burn-in, a permanent disfigurement of a TV or computer monitor
- Computer vision syndrome, eyestrain caused by excessive computer usage
