= Distraction =

Process of diverting the attention of an individual or group

Distraction is the process of diverting the attention of an individual or group from a desired area of focus and thereby blocking or diminishing the reception of desired information. Distraction is caused by: inability to pay attention; lack of interest in the object of attention; or the great intensity, novelty or attractiveness of something other than the object of attention. Distractions come from both external and internal sources. External distractions include factors such as visual triggers, social interactions, music, text messages and phone calls. Internal distractions include hunger, fatigue, illness, worrying and daydreaming. Both external and internal distractions contribute to loss of focus.

== Driving ==
Distracted driving is a dangerous threat to road safety across the world. While drunk driving rates have been on the decline since 1983, distracted driving has been increasing in recent years. Many feel this incline is due to the widespread prevalence of cell phones. While distracted driving can be attributed to anything that diverts attention away from the road, it is often the cell phone that receives the blame for distracted driving incidents. In addition to actively texting or calling, just knowing that one has received a call or text message can be distracting. Most of the recent studies have shown that cell phone usage while driving has striking similarities to the effects of drinking while driving; Cell phones tend to take the driver's attention away from the road and onto itself. With drunk driving, drivers often experience the "looking but not seeing" phenomena. While their eyes do indeed view objects on the road, their brains do not comprehend the meaning behind the image. All levels of distraction while driving are dangerous, and potential drivers are cautioned to keep awareness of their surroundings.

== In education ==
Many psychological studies show that switching between tasks, use of technology, and overstimulation has increased levels of distraction in the school setting. At school, distraction is often viewed as a source of poor performance and misbehavior. Distraction makes focusing on singular, assigned tasks more difficult. Digital components of learning are an emerging component to classroom distraction. Parents, teachers, students, and scholars all have opinions about how technology either benefits or harms a students' focus in an academic setting. Research studies show that neuron circuits indicate a decrease in ability to be attentive to goal relative stimulus with the addition of distracting stimuli interference. School-aged students, with developing brains, are more apt to conflicting stimuli while trying to focus. Large classroom sizes, technology use in and outside the classroom, and less natural stimuli have been seen as contributing factors to deflating test scores and classroom participation.

== In the workplace ==
Many computer workers keep multiple unrelated apps running at the same time.

Multitasking could also be considered as distraction in situations requiring full attention on a single object (e.g., sports, academic tests, performance). The issue of distraction in the workplace is studied in interruption science. According to Gloria Mark, a leader in interruption science, the average knowledge worker switches tasks every three minutes, and, once distracted, a worker takes nearly a half-hour to resume the original task.

== In fiction ==
In works of fiction, distraction is often used as a source of comedy, whether the amusement comes from the gullibility of those distracted or the strangeness of whatever is utilized to create the distraction. Examples of comedic distraction, also called comic relief, can oftentimes be found in Shakespearean plays. In Hamlet, Shakespeare includes a scene in which two gravediggers joke around about Ophelia's death. While her death is by no means meant to be funny, a small break from the sadness helped to appease the groundlings in Shakespeare's time, as well as allow the rest of the audience to take a break from the constant "doom and gloom" of his tragedies.

== In religion ==
Rabbi Alan Lew in his book, This Is Real and You Are Completely Unprepared, writes, "The thoughts that carry our attention away [during prayer or meditation] are never insignificant thoughts and they never arise at random. We lose our focus precisely because these thoughts need our attention and we refuse to give it to them. This is why they keep sneaking up on our attention and stealing it away. This is how it is that we come to know ourselves as we settle deeply into the act of prayer [or meditation]". According to philosopher Damon Young, distraction is chiefly an inability to identify, attend to or attain what is valuable, even when we are hard-working or content.

== In warfare ==
Distraction was a key battle strategy in tales from the Trojan War. According to the legend, the Greeks seemed to have retreated by pretending to sail away. In their stead, they left a large wooden horse, which the Trojans then chose to bring back within their walls in order to celebrate their supposed victory. The Greeks used the Trojans' pride as a distraction, as they actually hid men within the Trojan Horse in order to let the rest of the army in during the cover of night. The Greeks then entered and destroyed the city of Troy, effectively ending the 10-year standoff that was the Trojan War.

Distraction can suggest fake targets. In open field with mass military strategy, sometimes a contingent of troops distracts the enemy army to expose their flank, or to draw them away from a key point or fortification. Flares can also divert enemy soldiers' attention.

== In medicine ==
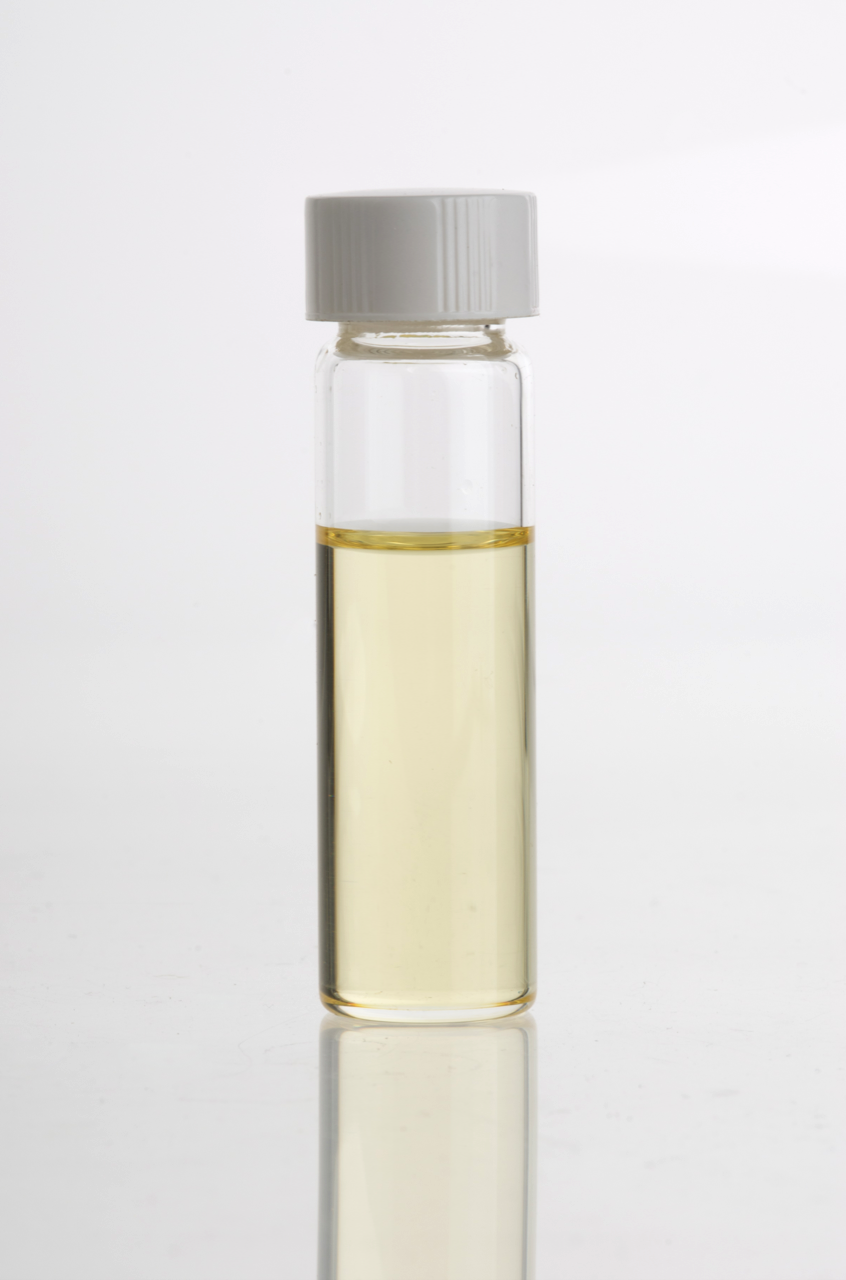
Clove oil (Syzygium aromaticum) essential oil in glass vial

Distraction is useful in the management of pain and anxiety. Dentists, for example may intentionally hum an annoying tune or engage in small talk just to create a diversion from the dental surgery process. Topical ointments containing capsaicin, provide a superficial burning sensation that can momentarily distract a patient's attention away from the more serious pain of arthritis or muscle strain. A similar effect is made by oil of cloves, which produces a burning sensation on the gums, and distracts from toothache.

Distraction is often used as a coping mechanism for short-term emotion regulation. When presented with an unpleasant reality, humans often choose to occupy their attention with some other reality in order to remain in a positive mental state. This is referred to as 'procrastination' when the unpleasant reality is in the form of work. The natural human inclination to distract oneself was put to the test when the Department of Psychology at Humboldt-Universität zu Berlin (Humboldt University of Berlin) held an experiment to study distraction. The goal of the experiment was to examine whether the effects of distraction on where subjects held their attention during repeated picture processing is changed by regular emotional functions. Furthermore, they hypothesized that while distraction assists in short-term emotional regulation, it is actually harmful in the long term. In order to do so, the experimenters had subjects view 15 unpleasant pictures (Set A) and "attend" to them (meaning the subjects were asked to pay full attention to the pictures). Next, the subjects were shown 15 unpleasant pictures (Set B) and were asked to distract themselves from the pictures (meaning they were to think about anything other than the picture on the screen; their example was to think about "the way to the supermarket"). Finally, the subjects were shown 15 neutral pictures (Set C) and were asked to attend to them. After 10 minutes of rest, the subjects entered the "re-exposure phase", which repeated the experiment- this time requiring the subjects to pay attention to all of the sets, including Set B. This experiment was performed on 3 separate blocks of participants. To examine the state of the subjects' brain, the subject was to wear "Ag/AgCl-electrodes from 61 head sites using an EasyCap electrode system with an equidistant electrode montage. Additional external electrodes were placed below the left (IO1) and right eye (IO2), below T1 (ground), on the nasion, and on the neck." The subjects were also asked to rate the unpleasantness of the picture on the screen on a scale of 1-9. To test whether distraction in the first phase resulted in increased responsiveness during the re-exposure phase, experimenters "compared mean unpleasantness ratings between unpleasant pictures that were previously presented in the attend (previous attention) versus distract (previous distraction) condition using a paired t-test". The end results of the experiment were as such:

- When presented with repeated neutral and unpleasant images, subjects had reduced unpleasant stimuli as reflected in their decreased LPP (late positive potential) amplitudes, but only when the participants were asked to attend to those pictures.
- When the subjects avoided confrontation with the unpleasant pictures through distraction, decrease in responsiveness was prevented as reflected in their constant LPP amplitudes.

Essentially, when exposed to an unpleasant image, the subject feels initial discomfort. However, after being exposed to it once with their full attention, the subject feels much less discomfort the second time they are exposed. When the subject distracts themselves from the initial unpleasant image, the subject feels more discomfort the second time when they are required to attend to the image. The experimenters' conclusion is thus: "the obtained results suggest that distraction inhibits elaborate processing of the stimulus' meaning and adapting to it."

== In crime ==
Con artists and shoplifters sometimes create a distraction to facilitate their crimes. Armed robbers may create a distraction after their robbery, such as pulling a fire alarm, to create confusion and aid in their getaway. In a more serious case of crime, the Columbine shooters used pipe bombs to distract from the shooting.

== In stage magic ==
Magicians use distraction techniques to draw the audience's attention away from whichever hand is engaged in sleight of hand. Magicians can accomplish this by encouraging the audience to look elsewhere or by having an assistant do or say something to draw the audience's attention away. Sleight of hand is often used in close-up magic, performed with the audience close to the magician, usually within three or four meters, possibly in physical contact. It often makes use of everyday items as props, such as cards and coins. The guiding principle of sleight-of-hand, articulated by legendary close-up magician Dai Vernon, is "be natural". A well-performed sleight looks like an ordinary, natural and completely innocent gesture, change in hand-position or body posture.

It is commonly believed that sleight of hand works because "the hand is quicker than the eye" but this is usually not the case. In addition to manual dexterity, sleight of hand depends on the use of psychology, timing, misdirection, and natural choreography in accomplishing a magical effect. Misdirection is perhaps the most important component of the art of sleight of hand. The magician choreographs his actions so that all spectators are likely to look where he or she wants them to. More importantly, they do not look where the performer does not wish them to look. Two types of misdirection are timing and movement. Timing is simple: by allowing a small amount of time to pass after an action, events are skewed in the viewer's mind. Movement is a little more complicated. A phrase often used is "A larger action covers a smaller action". Care must be taken however to not make the larger action so big that it becomes suspicious.

== By media ==
Propagandizing techniques of distraction are used in media manipulation. The idea is to encourage the public to focus on a topic or idea that the compliance professional feels is supportive of their cause. By focusing attention, a particular ideology can be made to seem the only reasonable choice. Oftentimes, media competition is the driving force for media bias, manipulation, and distraction. If a media company can find an audience with a united ideology, it then develops a loyal consumer base, as its consumers will be happy with the way media is presented. A so-called "conservative" media outlet would not hire a "liberal" reporter, as they would run the risk of alienating its viewership.

Distraction is also important in studies of media multitasking, or the simultaneous use of multiple media at once. This behavior has emerged as increasingly common since the 1990s, especially among younger media users. Studies show that while humans are predisposed to the desire to multitask, most people struggle to have legitimate productivity while multitasking. Instead of giving a task full attention, the split attention that multitasking necessitates can cause one task to be a distraction to another. On the other hand, some studies show that multitasking has the potential for a high-risk high-reward situation, leading to the idea that success can arise from multitasking if one is good at the activity.

Advertisers often seek to distract people and divert their attention to advertising content. This has been characterized as attention theft.
