= Computer-induced medical problems =

Healthcare issues caused by extended use of computers

Computer-induced health problems can be an umbrella term for the various problems a computer user can develop from extended and incorrect computer use. A computer user may experience many physical health problems from using computers extensively over a prolonged period in an inefficient manner. The computer user may have poor etiquette when using peripherals, for example incorrect posture. Reportedly, excessive use of electronic screen media can have ill effects on mental health related to mood, cognition, and behavior, even to the point of hallucination. Prevention methods include physical activity breaks, hydration, ergonomic posture, and regular eye exercises such as the 20-20-20 rule (every 20 minutes, look at something 20 feet or 6 meters away for 20 seconds).

== Common computer-induced medical problems ==
Notable physical medical problems that can arise from using computers include carpal tunnel syndrome, computer vision syndrome, and musculoskeletal problems.

=== Carpal tunnel syndrome ===
The medical problem associated with computer-related work is carpal tunnel syndrome (CTS). CTS is a stress-related injury caused by repetitive movement of joints, especially the wrist, and can lead to numerous musculoskeletal problems. It has become very common among computer professionals due to poorly placed computer components and extensive typing over a long period. Studies conducted show that one in eight computer professionals experience CTS. This study was conducted over 21 companies and the majority of affected people said that they experienced acute and in some cases severe pain due to CTS. The main cause of CTS seems to be debatable, however, with many sources saying that the syndrome is predominantly caused by the acute positioning of the wrist while typing and this problem is exacerbated by the need for the user to be crouching towards the screen while typing. Different research conducted cites the mouse as being the main cause of CTS as it was found that among the fingers the right thumb was revealed to be more susceptible to CTS due to the acute position of the thumb while using the mouse. CTS, although prevalent, seems to be very difficult to ameliorate or cure due to the consistency in the design of computer components such as the mouse and the keyboard, but some companies are leading the way with technologies such as touch screen monitors which will reduce stress on the hand and wrist. Employers in major companies are also taking measures to ameliorate CTS by implementing frequent work breaks and work rotation procedures to ensure that employees aren't working on a single computer for hours on end "a higher level of intensity of computer work results in higher risk for CTS". which causes severe stress on the joints and thus can lead to CTS

Cumulative trauma disorders are caused by "people who sit at PC workstations or visual display terminals in fast-paced, repetitive keystroke jobs. Their fingers, wrists, arms, necks, and back may become so weak and painful that they cannot work". Many people do not think about this when they look at their computer while using it. Everything down to the keyboard has a design process behind it focusing on user interface.

=== Computer vision syndrome ===
In many cases, frequent computer users develop computer vision syndrome, which is a degenerative eye problem which can result in severely reduced eyesight (myopia), blurred vision, overall eye tiredness and even glaucoma. Computer Eye Syndrome is an umbrella term for many problems but the causes of these problems can be easily identified. When using a computer due to the size and setup of the monitor and components it is necessary for the user to be within at least two feet of the monitor when performing any type of computational work. This presents many problems especially in older monitors due to an elevated amount of monitor glare, poor display quality and insufficient picture display refresh rates. Although these problems are more evident in older computers the newer models are not free from these problems either. Studies have been conducted. They state "Treatment requires a multidirectional approach combining ocular therapy with adjustment of the workstation" which shows these problems are quite easily solved with minimal investment from computer manufacturers through producing higher quality monitors with better resolution and refresh rates. The most common form of computer vision syndrome is a condition termed dry eye, which results in itchy, sore and even the illusion that something is stuck in your eye. This condition is often caused by extensively long period looking at a computer screen.

Video screens have a design process for user interface. Video screens can cause eyestrain from prolonged viewing. Cathode ray tubes are what are used to display the information on your computer. These send off radiation. This is a concern that has been taken into account when designing better computer screens for user interface.

=== Musculoskeletal problems ===
Another medical issue caused by the use of computers is back and posture problems. These problems relate to musculoskeletal disorders caused by the need for the user to be crouched and hunched towards the monitors and computer components due to the design and positioning of these particular computer peripherals. This hunching forward of the user causes posture and back problems but is also the cause of severe and acute pain in the upper back, particularly pain in the neck and or shoulders. A study was conducted where 2146 technical assistants installed a computer program to monitor the musculoskeletal pain they suffered and answered questionnaires on the location and severity of the pain. The study showed interesting results, as it detailed how in the majority of cases any pain suffered was aggravated and exacerbated by the use of computer peripherals like the mouse and keyboard but overall the pain did not originate from using computers. "Moreover, there seems to be no relationship between computer use and prolonged and chronic neck and shoulder pain". This is a positive study for computer manufacturers but although the pain may not originate from computer peripherals there is no doubt that the pain is exacerbated by their use and this revelation alone should lead computer manufacturers to pioneer new technologies that reduce the risk of posture or musculoskeletal problems aggravated by the use of poorly designed and linearly designed computer peripherals.

In another study, It was found that women are at a greater risk than men to develop musculoskeletal problems. Two explanations given were that "women appear to consistently report more neck and upper extremity symptoms than men", and that women may assume more taxing positions while working than men do due to differences in anthropometrics.

=== Sleep problems ===
More screen-time has been linked with shorter sleep duration, decreased sleep efficiency, and longer sleep onset delay. When using any screen before bedtime, the blue light emitted disrupts the body's natural melatonin hormone production. Melatonin is produced by the brain's pineal gland and controls the body's internal clock. This clock is what is referred to as the body's circadian rhythm and it naturally is responsive to light. Melatonin levels increase as the sun sets and remain at that increased state for the remainder of the night. As the sun rises, melatonin levels start to drop. This hormone reduction is what helps the body's natural rhythm wake up due to the bursts of natural sunlight. The light screens emit are in a similar spectrum of sunlight, but the blue light emission is what human circadian rhythms are most sensitive to. Studies have shown that the blue wavelengths are closely correlated to those from sunlight, which is what helps the body keep in sync with the sunrise and sunset. Therefore, using any screen prior to bedtime disrupts the body's production of natural bedtime hormones which can trick the brain to believe it is still daytime making it harder to fall asleep.

=== Mental problems ===
Public Health England said children who spend too long on the internet face social problems such as loneliness, depression and anxiety.

According to Dr. Victoria Dunckley, excessive use of electronic screen media can have ill effects on mental health related to cognition, and behavior—and may even result in psychosis in the form of hallucination. She calls this "Electronic Screen Syndrome" (ESS). She claims the root of these symptoms appears to be linked to repeated stress on the nervous system, making self-regulation and stress management less efficient. She says interacting with screens shifts the nervous system into fight-or-flight mode which leads to dysregulation as an inability to modulate one's mood, attention, or level of arousal in a manner appropriate to one's environment.

=== Apnea ===
Email apnea, also known as screen apnea, refers to the tendency to hold one's breath while engaging in some computer activities, particularly email writing. The term derives from sleep apnea, which involves repeated interruptions in breathing during sleep. This phenomenon can exacerbate anxiety, as it often occurs during high-stress situations, leading to increased physical tension and mental strain. According to psychologists, high achievers and perfectionists are especially prone to email apnea due to a tendency to seek perfection in every email or text they send, which increases the stress around it and demands more focus. Email apnea can result in sleep disturbances, decreased energy levels, and heightened feelings of depression and anxiety.

== Prevention ==
For many people, using a computer for several hours a day is indispensable as part of their job or personal needs, but there are some measures that can be taken to avoid or mitigate its negative effects on health:

- Take active breaks: Get up every 30-60 minutes, stretch your muscles, and walk around for a few minutes.
- Ergonomic posture: Adjust your chair and body for a straight and comfortable posture.
- Use a monitor at the correct height if you work on a laptop, in order to avoid putting strain on your neck.
- Eye exercises: Follow the 20-20-20 rule (every 20 minutes, look at something 20 feet or 6 meters away for 20 seconds).
- Lower the brightness: Avoid eye-strain and headaches by dimming your screen slightly.
- Daily physical activity: Balance sedentary time with regular exercise.

== See also ==
- Computer vision syndrome – Focusing the eyes on a display device for a protracted period of time
- Digital media use and mental health – Mental health effects of using digital media
- Dry eye syndrome – Medical condition of dry eyes
- Effect of computers on sleep
- Ergonomic hazard
- Screen time
