= Email apnea =

Breath-holding while answering emails

Email apnea is a term coined in 2007 by former Microsoft executive Linda Stone, meaning "a temporary absence or suspension of breathing, or shallow breathing, while doing email."

== Phenomenon ==
Email apnea refers to the tendency to hold one's breath while engaging in email activities, a term derived from sleep apnea, which involves repeated interruptions in breathing during sleep. The term was coined by writer, speaker, and Microsoft executive Linda Stone. This phenomenon can exacerbate anxiety, as it often occurs during high-stress situations, leading to increased physical tension and mental strain. According to psychologists, high achievers and perfectionists are especially prone to email apnea due to a tendency to seek perfection in every email they send, which increases the stress around it and demands more focus. Email apnea can result in sleep disturbances, decreased energy levels, and heightened feelings of depression and anxiety.

In 2007, Stone observed that she found herself holding her breath while answering emails, inhaling in anticipation but failing to exhale as emails arrived. To explore this, she conducted informal research by having friends and colleagues to respond to emails while monitoring their heart rates. She discovered that 80% of participants exhibited what she termed "email or screen apnea," characterized by shallow or suspended breathing during screen use. The remaining 20%, including trained professionals like a cellist and athletes, showed normal breathing patterns.

To counteract email or screen apnea, some psychologists have suggested sitting comfortably in an upright posture while focusing on breathing without control. Individuals should observe the sensations of inhalation and exhalation, redirecting attention to the breath if distracted. After three breaths, it is beneficial to stand, stretch and move briefly. Regular movement and stretching throughout the day are also recommended to reduce tension and enhance mindfulness.

== See also ==
- Computer-induced medical problems
