= Crossmodal =

Perception across sensory modalities

Crossmodal perception or cross-modal perception is perception that involves interactions between two or more different sensory modalities. Examples include synesthesia, sensory substitution and the McGurk effect, in which vision and hearing interact in speech perception.

Crossmodal perception, crossmodal integration and cross modal plasticity of the human brain are increasingly studied in neuroscience to gain a better understanding of the large-scale and long-term properties of the brain. A related research theme is the study of multisensory perception and multisensory integration.

== As a cultural movement ==
Described as synthesizing art, science and entrepreneurship, crossmodalism as a movement started in London in 2013. The movement focuses on bringing together the talents of traditionally distinct disciplines to make cohesive works. Crossmodalism has been compared to the Dadaist art movement of the 20th century, as well as other avant garde styles like futurism and surrealism.

== See also ==
- Crossmodal attention
- Ideasthesia
- Molyneux's problem
- Sensory substitution
