= Cognitive flexibility =

Ability to switch thinking about two concepts

Cognitive flexibility (Note: Other terms for and components of cognitive flexibility include mental flexibility, mental set shifting, cognitive shifting, task switching/shifting, attention switching/attentional shifting, and attentional control.) is an intrinsic property of a cognitive system often associated with the mental ability to adjust its activity and content, switch between different task rules and corresponding behavioral responses, maintain multiple concepts simultaneously and shift internal attention between them. The term cognitive flexibility is traditionally used to refer to one of the executive functions. In this sense, it can be seen as neural underpinnings of adaptive and flexible behavior. Most flexibility tests were developed under this assumption several decades ago. Nowadays, cognitive flexibility can also be referred to as a set of properties of the brain that facilitate flexible yet relevant switching between functional brain states.

Cognitive flexibility varies during the lifespan of an individual. In addition, certain conditions such as obsessive–compulsive disorder are associated with reduced cognitive flexibility. Since cognitive flexibility is a vital component of learning, deficits in this area might have other implications.

Two common approaches to studying of cognitive flexibility focus on the unconscious capacity for task switching and conscious ability of cognitive shifting. Methods of measuring cognitive flexibility include the A-not-B task, the Dimensional Change Card Sorting Task, the Multiple Classification Card Sorting Task, the Wisconsin Card Sorting Task, and the Stroop Test. Functional Magnetic Resonance Imaging (fMRI) research has shown that specific brain regions are activated when a person engages in cognitive flexibility tasks. These regions include the prefrontal cortex (PFC), basal ganglia, anterior cingulate cortex (ACC), and posterior parietal cortex (PPC). Studies conducted with people of various ages and with particular deficits have further informed how cognitive flexibility develops and changes within the brain.

Cognitive flexibility should not be confused with psychological flexibility, which is the ability to adapt to situational demands, to balance life demands and to commit to behaviors by thinking about problems and tasks in novel, creative ways (for example by changing a stance or commitment when unexpected events occur).

Cognitive flexibility should similarly be distinguished from the broader construct of versatility, which extends beyond task-switching within controlled paradigms to encompass effective adaptation across multiple domains and professional contexts.

== Definitions ==
The American Psychological Association (APA) defines cognitive flexibility as:

The capacity for objective appraisal and appropriately flexible action. Cognitive flexibility also implies adaptability and fair-mindedness.

— APA Dictionary of Psychology, "Cognitive Flexibility"

Cognitive flexibility varies during the lifespan of an individual. Researchers have more specifically described cognitive flexibility as the capacity to shift or switch one's thinking and attention between different tasks or operations typically in response to a change in rules or demands. For example, when sorting cards based on specific rules, children are considered cognitively flexible if they are able to successfully switch from sorting cards based on the color of the object to sorting based on the type of object on the card.

Cognitive flexibility has been more broadly described as the ability to adjust one's thinking from old situations to new situations as well as the ability to overcome responses or thinking that have become habitual and adapt to new situations. As such, if one is able to overcome previously held beliefs or habits (when it is required for new situations) then they would be considered cognitively flexible. Lastly, the ability to simultaneously consider two aspects of an object, idea, or situation at one point in time refers to cognitive flexibility. According to this definition, when sorting cards based on specific rules, children are considered cognitively flexible if they can sort cards based on the color of the objects and type of objects on the card simultaneously. Similarly, cognitive flexibility has been defined as having the understanding and awareness of all possible options and alternatives simultaneously within any given situation.

=== Contributing factors ===
Regardless of the specificity of the definition, researchers have generally agreed that cognitive flexibility is a component of executive functioning, higher-order cognition involving the ability to control one's thinking. Executive functioning includes other aspects of cognition, including inhibition, memory, emotional stability, planning, and organization. Cognitive flexibility is highly related with a number of these abilities, including inhibition, planning and working memory. Thus, when an individual is better able to suppress aspects of a stimulus to focus on more important aspects (i.e. inhibit color of object to focus on kind of object), they are also more cognitively flexible. In this sense, they are better at planning, organizing, and at employing particular memory strategies.

Researchers have argued that cognitive flexibility is also a component of multiple classification, as originally described by psychologist Jean Piaget. In multiple classification tasks, participants (primarily children, who have already developed or are in the process of developing this skill) must classify objects in several different ways at once - thereby thinking flexibly about them. Similarly, in order to be cognitively flexible they must overcome centration, which is the tendency for young children to solely focus on one aspect of an object or situation. For example, when children are young they may be solely able to focus on one aspect of an object (i.e. color of object), and be unable to focus on both aspects (i.e. both color and kind of object). Thus, research suggests if an individual is centrated in their thinking, then they will be more cognitively inflexible.

Research has suggested that cognitive flexibility is related to other cognitive abilities, such as fluid intelligence, reading fluency, and reading comprehension. Fluid intelligence, described as the ability to solve problems in new situations, enables fluid reasoning ability. When one is able to reason fluidly, they are in turn more likely to be cognitively flexible. Furthermore, those who are able to be cognitively flexible have been shown to have the ability to switch between and/or simultaneously think about sounds and meanings, which increases their reading fluency and comprehension. Cognitive flexibility has also been shown to be related to one's ability to cope in particular situations. For example, when individuals are better able to shift their thinking from situation to situation they will focus less on stressors within these situations.

In general, researchers in the field focus on development of cognitive flexibility between the ages of three and five. However, cognitive flexibility has been shown to be a broad concept that can be studied with all different ages and situations. Thus, with tasks ranging from simple to more complex, research suggests that there is a developmental continuum that spans from infancy to adulthood.

== Measures/assessments ==
A variety of assessments are appropriate for distinguishing between different levels of cognitive flexibility at different ages. Below are the common tests used to assess cognitive flexibility in the order of the developmentally appropriate age.

=== A-not-B task ===
In the A-not-B task, children are shown an object hidden at Location A within their reach, and are then prompted to search for the object at Location A, where they find it. This activity is repeated several times, with the hidden object at Location A. Then, in the critical trial and while the child is watching, the object is hidden in Location B, a second location within easy reach of child. Researchers have agreed that the A-not-B task is a simple task that effectively measures cognitive flexibility during infancy.

=== Dimensional Change Card Sorting Task ===
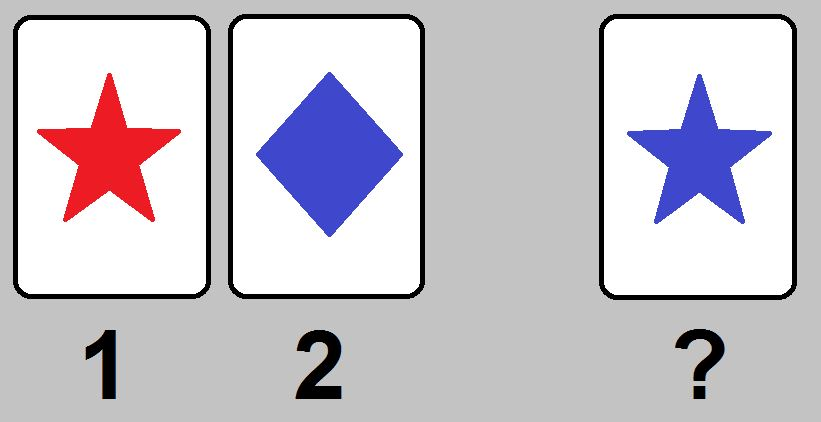
Dimensional Change Card Sorting Task

In the Dimensional Change Card Sorting Task (DCCS), children are initially asked to sort cards by a single dimension (such as color), and are subsequently required to alter their strategy to sort cards based on a second dimension (such as shape). Typically, three-year-old children are able to sort cards based on a single dimension, but are unable to switch to sort the cards based on a second dimension. However, five-year-old children are able to sort cards based on one dimension and can then switch to sorting cards on a second dimension.

=== Multiple Classification Card Sorting Task ===
Multiple Classification Card Sorting Task

In the Multiple Classification Card Sorting Task, children are shown cards and asked to sort them based on two different dimensions (e.g. by color, such as yellow and blue, and object type, such as animals and food) simultaneously into four piles within a matrix (e.g. yellow animals, yellow foods, blue animals and blue foods). This task appears to be more difficult as research has shown that seven-year-old children were incapable of sorting cards based on the two dimensions simultaneously. These children focused on the two dimensions separately, whereas at the age of eleven, children were capable of sorting cards based on these two dimensions simultaneously. This demonstrates an increase in cognitive flexibility between the ages of seven and eleven.

=== Wisconsin Card Sorting Test ===
Wisconsin Card Sorting Test

The Wisconsin Card Sorting Test (WCST) is used to determine an individual's competence in abstract reasoning, and the ability to change problem-solving strategies when needed.

In this test, a number of cards are presented to the participants. The figures on the cards differ with respect to color, quantity, and shape. The participants are then told to match the cards, but not how to match; however, they are told whether a particular match is right or wrong. The ability to switch matching rules is measured. Typically, children between ages nine and eleven demonstrate the cognitive flexibility needed for this test.

=== Stroop Test ===
The Stroop Test is also known as the Color-word Naming Test. In this measure, there are three types of cards in the deck. The "color card" displays patches of different colors, which participants are asked to identify as quickly as possible. The "word card," displays the names of colors printed in black and white ink, which participants are again asked name as quickly as possible. The final card type is the "color-word card", which displays the names of the colors printed in an ink of a conflicting color (e.g. the word RED would be printed in yellow), and requires participants to name the ink colors while ignoring the conflicting color names. The basic score on each card is the total time (in seconds) that the participant takes to respond verbally. Typically, naming the color of the word takes longer and results in more errors when the color of the ink does not match the name of the color. In this situation, adults tend to take longer to respond than children because adults are more sensitive to the actual color of the word and thus are more likely to be influenced by it when naming the conflicting color word printed.

== Neural underpinnings ==
Understanding of the mechanisms underlying cognitive flexibility is a subject of current research. It remains an elusive property of distributed brain function that instantiates itself in many ways. Human studies using functional magnetic resonance imaging (fMRI) and animal studies using optogenetics have shown that cognitive flexibility relies on a variety of distinct regions of the brain that work in concert, including the prefrontal cortex (PFC), anterior cingulate cortex (ACC), posterior parietal cortex (PPC), basal ganglia, and thalamus.

The regions active during engagement of cognitive flexibility depend on the task and various factors involved in flexibility that are used to assess the behavior, as flexible thinking requires aspects of inhibition, attention, working memory, response selection, and goal maintenance. Several studies using task switching paradigms have demonstrated the complexities of the network involved in cognitive flexibility. Activation of the dorsolateral PFC has been shown during resolution of interference of irrelevant task sets. Another study further extended these results by demonstrating that the level of abstractness of the switch type influenced recruitment of differing regions in the PFC depending on whether the participant was asked to make a cognitive set switch, a response switch, or a stimulus or perceptual switch. A set switch would require switching between task rules, as with the WCST, and is considered to be the most abstract. A response switch would require different response mapping, such as circle right button and square left button and vice versa. Lastly, a stimulus or perceptual set switch would require a simple switch between a circle and a square. Activation is mediated by the level of abstractness of the set switch in an anterior to posterior fashion within the PFC, with the most anterior activations elicited by set switches and the most posterior activations resulting from stimulus or perceptual switches. The basal ganglia is active during response selection and the PPC, along with the inferior frontal junction are active during representation and updating of task sets called domain general switching. Network energy analysis revealed that the frontoparietal and dorsal attention networks primarily operate efficiently during cognitive flexibility, while the salience network and subcortical structures exhibit moderate levels of efficiency in supporting this function. Task-based functional magnetic resonance imaging (fMRI) studies have provided detailed insights into the key brain regions involved in cognitive flexibility, including the inferior frontal junction and areas within the midcingulo-insular network, such as the insular cortex and dorsal anterior cingulate cortex, emphasizing their critical role in adapting to changing task demands.

=== Development ===
Children can be strikingly inflexible when assessed using traditional tests of cognitive flexibility, but this does not come as a surprise considering the many cognitive processes involved in the mental flexibility, and the various developmental trajectories of such abilities. With age, children generally show increases in cognitive flexibility which is likely a product of the protracted development of the frontoparietal network evident in adults, with maturing synaptic connections, increased myelination and regional gray matter volume occurring from birth to mid-twenties.

=== Deficits ===
Diminished cognitive flexibility has been noted in a variety of neuropsychiatric disorders such as anorexia nervosa, obsessive–compulsive disorder, schizophrenia, autism, and in a subset of people with ADHD. Each of these disorders exhibit varying aspects of cognitive inflexibility. For example, those with obsessive–compulsive disorder experience difficulty shifting their attentional focus as well as inhibiting motor responses. Children with autism show a slightly different profile with deficits in adjusting to changing task contingencies, while often maintaining the ability to respond in the face of competing responses. Potential treatments may lie in neurochemical modulation. Juveniles with anorexia nervosa have marked decreases in set-shifting abilities, possibly associated with incomplete maturation of prefrontal cortices associated with malnutrition. One can also consider people with addictions to be limited in cognitive flexibility, in that they are unable to flexibly respond to stimuli previously associated with the drug.

=== Aging ===
The elderly often experience deficits in cognitive flexibility. The aging brain undergoes physical and functional changes including a decline in processing speed, central sensory functioning, white matter integrity, and brain volume. Regions associated with cognitive flexibility such as the PFC and PC atrophy, or shrink, with age, but also show greater task-related activation in older individuals when compared to younger individuals. This increase in blood flow is potentially related to the evidence that atrophy heightens blood flow and metabolism, which is measured as the BOLD response, or blood-oxygen-level dependence, with fMRI. Studies suggest that aerobic exercise and training can have plasticity inducing effects that could potentially serve as an intervention in old age that combat the decline in executive function.

== Implications for education and general learning ==
=== Educational applications ===
Cognitive flexibility and other executive function skills are crucial to success both in classroom settings and life. A study examining the impact of cognitive intervention for at-risk children in preschool classrooms found that children who received such intervention for one to two years significantly outperformed their peers. Compared to same-age children who were randomly assigned to the control condition (a literacy unit developed by the school district), preschoolers who received intervention achieved accuracy scores of 85% on tests of inhibitory control (self-discipline), cognitive flexibility, and working memory. Their peers in the control (no intervention) condition, on the other hand, demonstrated only 65% accuracy. Educators involved in this study ultimately opted to implement the cognitive skills training techniques instead of the district-developed curriculum.

Further indicative of the role cognitive flexibility plays in education is the argument that how students are taught greatly impacts the nature and formation of their cognitive structures, which in turn affect students' ability to store and readily access information. A crucial aim of education is to help students learn as well as appropriately apply and adapt what they have learned to novel situations. This is reflected in the integration of cognitive flexibility into educational policy regarding academic guidelines and expectations. For example, as outlined in the Common Core State Standards Initiative, a standards-based education reform developed to increase high school graduation rates, educators are expected to present within the classroom "high level cognitive demands by asking students to demonstrate deep conceptual understanding through the application of content knowledge and skills to new situations." This guideline is the essence of cognitive flexibility, and a teaching style focused on promoting it has been seen to foster understanding especially in disciplines where information is complex and nonlinear. A counterexample is evident in cases where such material is presented in an oversimplified manner and learners fail to transfer their knowledge to a new domain.

==== Impact on teaching and curriculum design ====
An alternative educational approach informed by cognitive flexibility is hypertext, which is frequently computer-supported instruction. Computers allow for complex data to be presented in a multidimensional and coherent format, allowing users to access that data as needed. The most widely used example of hypertext is the Internet, which dynamically presents information in terms of interconnection (e.g. hyperlinks). Hypertext documents, therefore, include nodes – bits of information – and links, the pathways between these nodes. Applications for teacher education have involved teacher-training sessions based on video instruction, whereby novice teachers viewed footage of master teachers conducting a literacy workshop. In this example, the novice teachers received a laserdisc of the course content, a hypertext document that allowed the learners to access content in a self-directed manner. These cognitive flexibility hypertexts (CFH) provide a "three-dimensional" and "open-ended" representation of material for learners, enabling them to incorporate new information and form connections with preexisting knowledge. While further research is needed to determine the efficacy of CFH as an instructional tool, classrooms where cognitive flexibility theory is applied in this manner are hypothesized to result in students more capable of transferring knowledge across domains.

Researchers in the field advocate a teaching style that incorporates group problem-solving activities and demands higher-level thought. According to this process, a teacher initially poses a single question in a number of ways. Next, students discuss the problem with the teacher and amongst themselves, asking questions. In forming these questions, students are actively brainstorming and recalling prior knowledge. At this point, the teacher provides specific conditions of the issue discussed, and students must adapt their prior knowledge, along with that of their peers, to generate a solution.

==== Learning applications beyond the classroom ====
A vastly different application can be seen in the study of cognitive flexibility and video games. Examining the trait under the guise of "mental flexibility", Dutch researchers observed that players of first-person shooter games (e.g. Call of Duty, Battlefield) exhibited greater "mental flexibility" on a series of measures than did non-gamers. The researchers posit that, while video game play may be controversial due to frequently graphic content, harnessing the effect of such games could lead to similar gains in various populations (e.g. the elderly, who face cognitive decline) and is therefore socially relevant.

Several online programs marketed to those seeking to increase cognitive ability have been created to enhance "brain fitness", including cognitive flexibility.

== See also ==
- Flexibility (personality)
- Human multitasking
- Need for cognition
