= Ocular neurosis =

Medical condition

Ocular neurosis is the usual cause of eye strain headache that begins abruptly with use of the eyes in which there is a normal ophthalmologic exam.

ICD classification: F45.8 Neurosis ocular
