= Focus phrase =

"Focus Phrase" is a term used in cognitive-therapy and awareness-management discussions to describe elicitor statements that evoke a desired refocusing of attention. Psychologically related terms are elicitor phrase or statement of intent.

== Definition ==
"Focus phrase" is defined as "a specially-constructed short sentence or phrase that states a person's inner intent to refocus his or her attention immediately in a new pre-ordained direction".

The term Focus Phrase has been studied academically as a part of a Semantics dissertation.

== See also ==
- Mindfulness Therapy
- Acceptance and Commitment Therapy
