= Ocular surface microbiome =

Human microbiome of the eye

A diagram of the human eye.

The ocular surface microbiome or ocular microbiome is the microbiota, including bacteria and fungi, that live on the eye, mainly the conjunctiva and cornea. Flora found on the eyelid and eyelashes are considered to be part of the skin microbiome, although some bacteria are shared across regions. Compared to other human microbiomes, the ocular surface microbiome is sparsely populated and with a low diversity, with approximately one bacterium per 20 recovered epithelial cells. This may be due to the antimicrobial properties of enzymes found in tears, which break down cell walls and prevent bacteria from reproducing.

Some microbes found on the ocular surface have been associated with keratitis, Stevens-Johnson syndrome, trachoma, contact lens-induced dysbiosis, Sjorgen's syndrome, dry eye disease, blepharitis, diabetes-induced dysbiosis and retinopathy. Extended use of contact lenses leads to an increased risk of ocular infections.

== Composition ==
Approximately 98% of microbiota on the ocular surface are bacteria, while viruses and fungi account for about 1% each. The microbiota play a role in maintaining homeostasis of the ocular surface and preventing the colonisation of pathogens.

=== Bacteria ===
The dominant phyla found in the ocular microbiome are Actinomycetota, Proteobacteria, and Firmicutes, making up 46%, 24% and 22% of the total bacteria, respectively. The genera of Corynebacterium and Staphylococcus are the most prevalent. Pseudomonas, which is not considered part of the healthy eye, has been consistently identified across numerous studies.

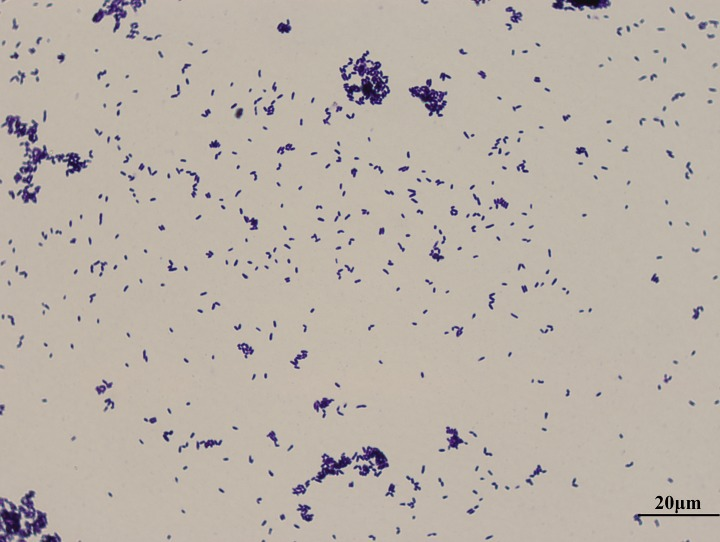
Corynebacterium xerosis

Bacteria of the ocular surface have a protective immunoregulatory function and help increase resistance to pathogenic bacterial infections, and therefore the use of antibiotics or other antimicrobials may cause a disruption to this process. It was also found that in contact lens wearers the bacterial residents of the microbiome are altered towards a community more akin to that of the skin microbiome.

=== Viruses ===
Several viruses are found on the microbiome, including torque teno virus (TTV), Merkel cell polyomavirus, and human papillomavirus. In a healthy conjunctiva, multiple sclerosis–associated retrovirus and TTV are found. TTV is the most predominant viral resident on the ocular microbiome, and in one study was found in 65% of samples.

It was found that the removal of Corynebacterium mastitis, a gram-positive bacterium, makes the microbiome more susceptible to infections.

=== Fungi ===
Candida albicans, a fungus found on the ocular surface.

In children and adolescents, Candida albicans can be present, but it was found to be more common postmortem than pre-surgically. The genera of Aspergillus, Setosphaeria, Malassezia, and Haematonectria are largely prevalent on the conjuctiva. Opportunistic pathogens may be found on the healthy ocular surface fungal microbiomes.

== Variation ==
It has been found that immediately following birth the neonatal conjunctiva has a higher level of positive cultures, as well as a greater diversity of species, although it is largely dominated by Staphylococcus and Propionibacterium. Aerobic cocci and Propionibacterium are most common in younger age groups, decreasing with age. It is suggested that there is a change in the ocular microbiota between birth and adolescence, before stabling out until later in life, where it may become more diverse. Sex also has a minor impact on the different microbiota found, a decrease of P. acnes and S. epidermidis from males to females and an increase of E.coli in females.

A variation in geographical locations causes a change in some of the species found on the ocular surface, although Pseudomonas and Acinetobacter remain consistent across geographical regions. There also seems to be a seasonal change in species.

== Management ==
In order to maintain a stable ocular surface microbiome it is recommended to avoid using harsh chemicals around the eyes, such as shampoos or facewash. Contact lenses should be removed during night, and sufficient sleep is important in cultivating a healthy ocular microbiome.
