= Wisconsin Card Sorting Test =

Neuropsychological test

- Screenshot from the PEBL computerized version of the Wisconsin Card sort
- Purpose: measure frontal lobe dysfunction

The Wisconsin Card Sorting Test (WCST) is a neuropsychological test of set-shifting, which is the capability to show flexibility when exposed to changes in reinforcement. The WCST was written by David A. Grant and Esta A. Berg. The Professional Manual for the WCST was written by Robert K. Heaton, Gordon J. Chelune, Jack L. Talley, Gary G. Kay, and Glenn Curtiss.

== Method ==
Stimulus cards are shown to the participant and the participant is then instructed to match the cards. They are not given instructions on how to match the cards but are given feedback when the matches they make are right or wrong. When the test was first released the method of showing the cards was done with an evaluator using paper cards with the evaluator on one side of the desk facing the participant on the other. The test takes approximately 12–20 minutes to carry out using manual scoring which is greatly reduced with the aid of computer testing. The test results produce a number of useful psychometric scores, including numbers, percentages, and percentiles of: categories achieved, trials, errors, and perseverative errors.

The WCST has been shown to be reliable and valid in multiple populations including people with autism, people recovering from a stroke, pediatric populations, and psychiatric populations.

== Clinical use ==
Since 1948, the test has been used by neuropsychologists and clinical psychologists in patients with acquired brain injury, neurodegenerative disease, or mental illness such as schizophrenia. It is one of several psychological tests which can be administered to patients to measure frontal lobe dysfunction. When administered, the WCST allows the clinician to speculate to the following frontal lobe functions: strategic planning, organized searching, utilizing environmental feedback to shift cognitive sets, directing behavior toward achieving a goal, and modulating impulsive responding. The test can be administered to those from 6.5 years to 89 years of age. The WCST relies upon a number of cognitive functions, including attention, working memory, and visual processing. The WCST was originally developed to measure abstract reasoning; as such it may be used to help measure an individual's competence in abstract reasoning, and the ability to change problem-solving strategies when needed. In this test, a number of cards are presented to the participants. The figures on the cards differ with respect to color, quantity, and shape.

Psychological tests such as the WCST, administered alone, cannot be used to measure the effects of a frontal lobe injury, or the aspects of cognitive function it may affect, such as working memory; a variety of tests must be used. A participant may be good at one task but show dysfunction in executive function overall. Similarly, test results can be made misleading after testing the same individual over a long period of time. The participant may get better at a task, but not because of an improvement in executive cognitive function; they may have simply learned some strategies for doing this particular task that made it no longer a good measurement tool.
