= Biological effects of high-energy visible light =

Blue-light toxicity

Blue light, a type of high-energy light, is part of the visible light spectrum.

High-energy visible light (HEV light) is short-wave light in the violet/blue band from 400 to 450 nm in the visible spectrum, which in artificial narrowband form has a number of proven negative biological effects, namely on circadian rhythm and retinal health (blue-light hazard), which can lead to age-related macular degeneration.

Increasingly, blue blocking filters are being designed into glasses to avoid blue light's purported negative effects. There are mixed findings on the benefits of using blue light blocking glasses, with the largest benefits being for those who suffer from insomnia, bipolar disorder, delayed sleep phase disorder, or ADHD to use the glasses before bed.

== Background ==
Blue LEDs are often the target of blue-light research due to the increasing prevalence of LED displays and Solid-state lighting (e.g. LED illumination), as well as the blue appearance (higher color temperature) compared with traditional sources. However, natural sunlight has a relatively high spectral density of blue light, so exposure to high levels of blue light is not a new or unique phenomenon despite the relatively recent emergence of LED display technologies. While LED displays emit white by exciting all RGB LEDs, white light from lighting is generally produced by pairing a blue LED emitting primarily near 450 nm combined with a phosphor for down-conversion of some of the blue light to longer wavelengths, which then combine to form white light. This is often considered "the next generation of illumination" as SSL technology dramatically reduces energy resource requirements.

Blue LEDs, particularly those used in white LEDs, operate at around 450 nm, where V(λ)=0.038. This means that blue light at 450 nm requires about 25 times the radiant flux (energy) for one to perceive the same luminous flux as green light at 555 nm. For comparison, UV-A at 380 nm (V(λ)=0.000 039) requires 25 641 times the amount of radiometric energy to be perceived at the same intensity as green, three orders of magnitude greater than blue LEDs. Studies often compare animal trials using identical luminous flux rather than radiance meaning comparative levels of perceived light at different frequencies rather than total emitted energy.

== Physiological effects ==
=== Blue LED light hazard ===
A 2019 report by France's Agency for Food, Environmental and Occupational Health & Safety (ANSES) highlights short-term effects on the retina linked to intense exposure to blue LED light, and long-term effects linked to the onset of age-related macular degeneration. Although few studies have examined occupational causes of macular degeneration, they show that long-term sunlight exposure, specifically its blue-light component, is associated with macular degeneration in outdoor workers. While the CIE published its position on the low risk of blue-light hazard resulting from the use of LED technology in general lighting bulbs in April 2019, numerous studies have shown that LED light is more harmful than other light sources.

The international standard IEC 62471 assesses the photobiological safety of light sources. A proposed standard, IEC 62778, provides additional guidance in the assessment of blue-light hazard of all lighting products. Blue light has been implicated as the cause of digital eye strain, but there is no robust evidence to support this hypothesis. As with other types of light therapy, there is no good evidence that blue light is of use in treating acne vulgaris.

=== Circadian rhythm ===
The circadian rhythm is a mechanism that regulates sleep patterns. One of the primary factors affecting the circadian rhythm is the excitation of melanopsin, a light sensitive protein that absorbs maximally at 480 nm, but has at least 10% efficiency in the range of 450–540 nm. The periodic (daily) exposure to sunlight generally tunes the circadian rhythm to a 24-hour cycle. However, exposure to light sources that excite melanopsin in the retina during nighttime can interfere with the circadian rhythm. Harvard Health Publishing asserts that exposure to blue light at night has a strong negative effect on sleep. The aforementioned ANSES report "highlights [the] disruptive effects to biological rhythms and sleep, linked to exposure to even very low levels of blue light in the evening or at night, particularly via screens". A 2016 press release by the American Medical Association concludes that there are negative effects on the circadian rhythm from the unrestrained use of LED street lighting and white LED lamps have 5 times greater impact on circadian sleep rhythms than conventional street lamps. However, they also indicate that street lamp brightness is more strongly correlated to sleep outcomes.

Blue light is essential for regulating the circadian rhythm, because it stimulates melanopsin receptors in the eye. This suppresses daytime melatonin, enabling wakefulness. Working in blue-free light (aka yellow light) for long periods of time disrupts circadian patterns because there is no melatonin suppression during the day, and reduced melatonin rebound at night.

== Blue light blocking ==
Concerns over exposure to blue light has predicated several solutions to decreasing blue light exposure, including disabling or attenuating blue LEDs in displays, color shifting displays towards yellow, or wearing glasses that filter out blue light.

=== Digital filters ===
Apple's and Microsoft's operating systems and even the preset settings of standalone computer monitors include options to reduce blue-light emissions by adjusting color temperature to a warmer gamut. However, these settings dramatically reduce the size of the color gamut of the display, as they essentially simulate tritan color blindness, thereby sacrificing the usability of the displays. The filters can be set on a schedule to activate only when the sun is down.

In 2024, the Daylight Computer Co. created the Daylight DC-1, an Android tablet that does not emit blue light and is designed to be used outdoors in the sunlight. It can also be used indoors and utilizes an amber backlight.

=== Built-in blue-light filters ===
Some display devices (such as some monitors, TVs and laptops) are included built-in blue-light filters, and that blue-light filter may be hardware-based or firmware-based. TÜV offers "TÜV Low Blue Light" certifications for display devices.

=== Intraocular lenses ===
During cataract surgery, the opaque natural crystalline lens is replaced with a synthetic intraocular lens (IOL). The IOL may be designed to filter out equal, more or less UV light than the natural lens (have a higher or lower cutoff), and therefore attenuate or accentuate the blue-light hazard function. The effects of long term exposure of UV, violet and blue light on the retina can then be studied. However, it has been argued that IOLs that remove more blue light than natural lenses negatively affect color vision and the circadian rhythm while not offering significant photoprotection. Systematic reviews found no evidence of any effect in IOLs filtering blue light, and none provided any reliable statistical evidence to suggest any effect regarding contrast sensitivity, macular degeneration, vision, color-discrimination or sleep disturbances. One study claimed a large difference in observed fluorescein angiography examinations and observed markedly less "progression of abnormal fundus autofluorescence"; however the authors failed to discuss the fact that the excitation beam is filtered light between 465 and 490 nm, is largely blocked by blue light filtering IOLs but not clear IOLs present in the control patients.

=== Blue light blocking lenses ===
Lenses that filter blue light have been on the market for a long time in the form of brown-, orange-, and yellow-tinted sunglasses. These tinted lenses were popular for the belief that they enhanced contrast and depth perception, but after early research showing the health risks of blue light exposure, became more popular for the purported health benefits of blocking blue light.

The efficacy of blue-blocking lenses in blocking blue light is not disputed, but whether typical exposure to blue light is hazardous enough to require blue blocking lenses is highly disputed. One problem with the glasses is that they cannot achieve positive outcomes in blue-light hazard and sleep simultaneously. To be effective against blue-light hazard, the glasses must be worn continuously, especially during the day when exposure is higher. However, to force blue-light exposure that mimics the normal daylight cycle, the glasses must only be worn at night, when the exposure is already quite low from a photoprotective perspective. Regardless, some evidence shows that lenses that block blue light before bedtime may be particularly useful for people with insomnia, bipolar disorder, delayed sleep phase disorder, or ADHD, though less beneficial for healthy sleepers. The small number of studies contributing to those conclusions to date have methodological flaws or risks of bias, so further research is warranted.

Aggressive advertisements may contribute to the incorrect public perception of the purported dangers of blue light. Even when research has shown no evidence to support the use of blue-blocking filters as a clinical treatment for digital eye strain, ophthalmic lens manufacturers continue to market them as lenses that reduce digital eye strain.

The UK's General Optical Council has criticised Boots Opticians for their unsubstantiated claims regarding their line of blue-light filtering lenses; and the Advertising Standards Authority fined them £40,000. Boots Opticians sold the lenses for a £20 markup. Trevor Warburton, speaking on behalf of the UK Association of Optometrists stated: "...current evidence does not support making claims that they prevent eye disease.".

In July 2022, a Gamer Advantage advert on Twitch channel BobDuckNWeave was banned by the Advertising Standards Authority for making claims that blue light glasses could improve sleep without substantiation.

== See also ==
- Fluorescent lamps and health
- Phase response curve
- Ultraviolet light
