= Layer of rods and cones =

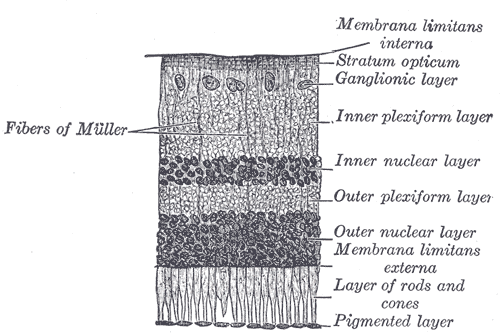
- Section of retina. (Layer of rods and cones labeled at right, second from the bottom.)

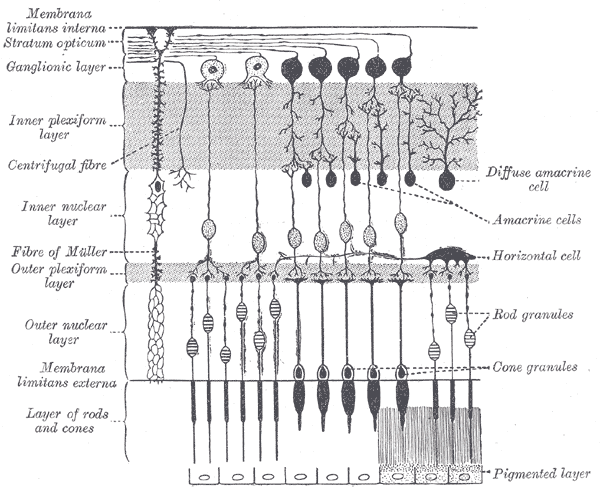
- Plan of retinal neurons. (Layer of rods and cones labeled at left, at the bottom.)

Details

Identifiers
- Latin: Stratum photosensorium retinae

The elements composing the layer of rods and cones (Jacob's membrane) in the retina of the eye are of two kinds, rod cells and cone cells, the former being much more numerous than the latter except in the macula lutea.

Jacob's membrane is named after Irish ophthalmologist Arthur Jacob, who was the first to describe this nervous layer of the retina.
