= Linda Stone =

American technology writer

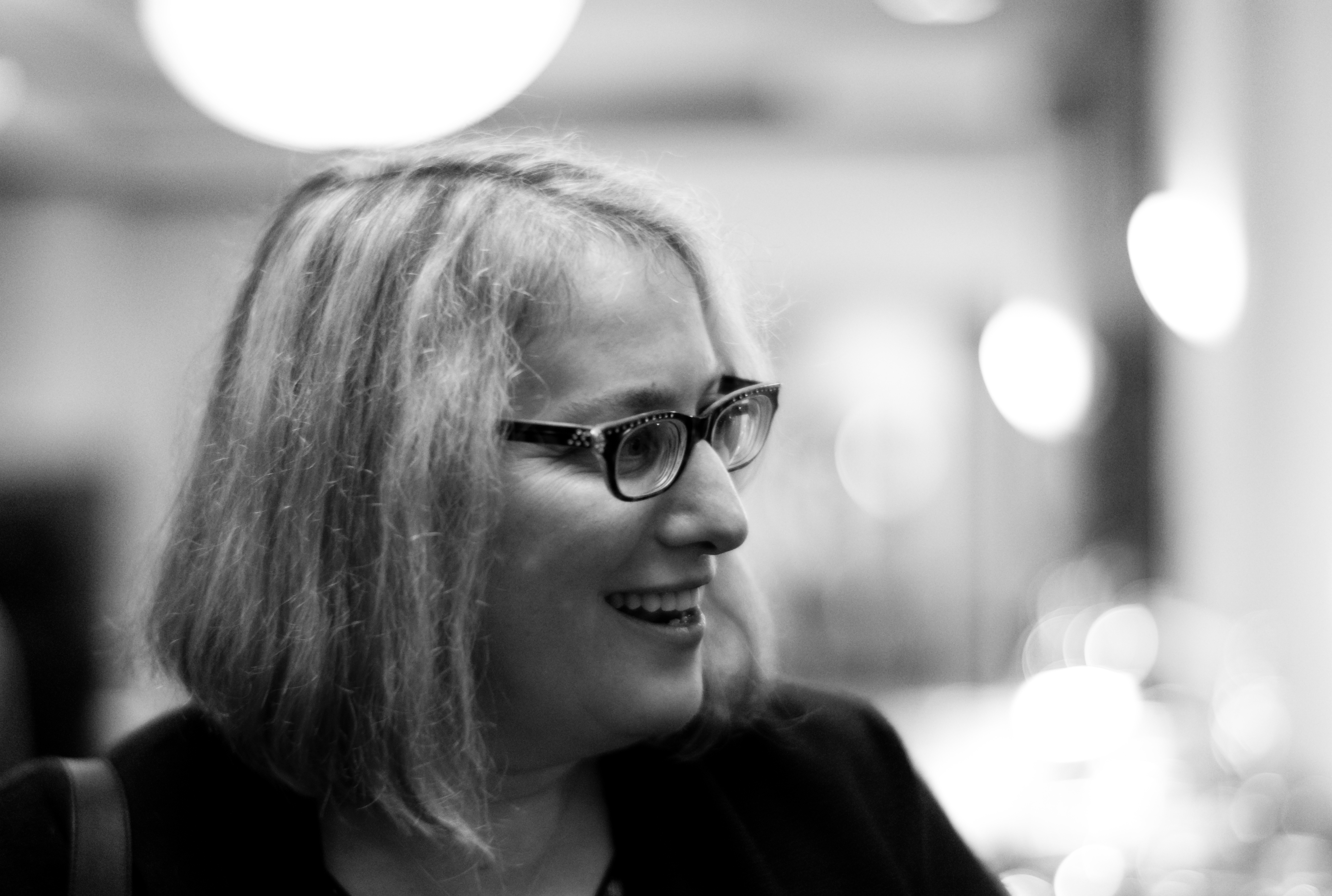
- Born: 1955 (age 70–71)
- Occupations: writer, consultant
- Known for: Coining "continuous partial attention"
- Notable work: Science Foo Camp

Linda Stone (born 1955) is a writer and pioneer of Internet-focused sociology research. She coined the phrase "continuous partial attention" in 1998 and "email apnea" in 2008.

== Career ==
Before her tech career, Stone was a children's librarian and primary school teacher outside Seattle. She developed an interest in computers in the early 1980s while recovering from a car accident and began advocating for computers in schools. She joined Apple Computer in 1986, where her role involved producing CD-ROMs. In her last of seven years at Apple, she assisted CEO John Sculley with special projects. Microsoft Research recruited her in 1993 to work under Nathan Myhrvold and Rick Rashid. Stone co-founded the company's Virtual Worlds group to research online social interaction and digital communities. While director of the group, she taught at New York University's Interactive Telecommunications Program as an adjunct. In 2000, she became a vice president of Microsoft focused on industry relationships and corporate culture. She left in 2002.

Stone served a six-year term on the National Board of the World Wildlife Fund and is currently on the WWF National Council. She is an adviser for the Internet and American Life Project and the Hidden Brain Drain Task Force for the Center for Worklife Policy, and was on the Advisory Board of the MIT Media Lab for social computing. Stone has been written about in many major publications, including Wired, the New York Times, and Forbes.

She conceived Science Foo Camp, a series of interdisciplinary scientific conferences organized by O'Reilly Media and Nature Publishing Group.
