= Computer vision syndrome =

Focusing the eyes on a display device for a protracted period of time

Computer vision syndrome (CVS) is a condition resulting from focusing the eyes on a computer, smartphone or other display device for protracted, uninterrupted periods of time and the eye's muscles being unable to recover from the constant tension required to maintain focus on a close object.

== Symptoms and signs ==
Some symptoms of CVS include headaches, blurred vision, neck pain, fatigue, eye strain, dry eyes, irritated eyes, double vision, vertigo/dizziness, polyopia, and difficulty refocusing the eyes. These symptoms can be further aggravated by improper lighting conditions (i.e. glare, strong blue-spectrum backlights, watching phone on dark environments, or bright overhead lighting) or air moving past the eyes (e.g. overhead vents, or direct air from a fan). Although most contributors of the syndrome stem from the screen itself, personal factors such as poor sitting position and improper viewing distances have an effect as well.

== Therapy ==
Asthenopic (eye strain) symptoms in the eye are responsible for much of the severity in CVS. Proper rest to the eye and its muscles is recommended to relieve the associated eye strain. Observations from persons experiencing chronic eye strain have shown that most people who claim to be getting enough sleep are actually not. This, unaware to them, causes the eye strain to build up over a period of time, when if they had obtained seven to eight hours of uninterrupted sleep, their eye muscles would have recovered during the sleep and the strain would not have built up.

Computer workers are often advised to take breaks and look at distant objects. A routinely recommended approach is to consciously blink the eyes every now and then to help replenish the tear film and to look out the window to a distant object or to the sky—doing so provides rest to the ciliary muscles. An example of a common catchphrase is the "20–20–20 rule": every 20 minutes, focus the eyes on an object 20 feet (approximately 6 meters) away for 20 seconds. This gives a convenient distance and timeframe for a person to follow advice from an optometrist or ophthalmologist.

A number of computer and smartphone applications adjust the computer video color temperature, reducing the effects of blue light emitted by the screen, particularly at night.

Dry eye is a symptom that is targeted in the therapy of CVS. The use of over-the-counter artificial-tear solutions can reduce the effects of dry eye in CVS. Prior to using artificial tear solutions, it is necessary to check if dry eye is the actual cause of the problem (measured by a tear meniscus test) or whether there are no actual symptoms of dry eye at all. Dry eyes because of CVS can also be treated using moisture chamber glasses or humidifier machines. Office spaces with artificially dry air can worsen CVS syndromes, in which case, a desktop or a room humidifier can help the eyes keep a healthy moisture level.

At night, CVS can become worse. It is recommended to use a dark user interface while working at night on the computer. Several browser and OS settings or add-ons exist to darken the user interface.

A 2017 randomized controlled trial evaluated macular carotenoid supplements (lutein, zeaxanthin, and mesozeaxanthin) in people with high screen time usage. The supplement group had statistically significant reduction in self-reported headache, eye strain, eye fatigue and sleep complaints, but no reduction in neck strain or blurry vision.

A 2021 review investigated suggested therapies for CVS and found little supporting evidence for the following: switching to bi- or multi-focal glasses to reduce eye strain, or using glasses that block blue light. The same review reported "low-certainty" in omega-3 supplements as a method to combat CVS.

=== Eyeglasses ===
Decreased focusing capability is mitigated by wearing a small plus-powered (+1.00 to +1.50) over-the-counter pair of eyeglasses. Wearing these eyeglasses helps such patients regain their ability to focus on near objects. People who are engaged in other occupations—such as tailors engaged in embroidery—can experience similar symptoms and can be helped by these glasses.

A Pacific University research study of 36 participants found significant differences in irritation or burning of the eyes, tearing, or watery eyes, dry eyes, and tired eyes, that were each improved by amber colored lenses versus placebo lenses, but in a follow-up study in 2008, the same team was not able to reproduce the results of the first study.

A study sponsored by the lens industry has shown blue light-filtering lenses decrease specific aspects of light emissions. Theoretical reductions in phototoxicity were 10.6% to 23.6%. Additionally, melatonin suppression was reduced by 5.8% to 15.0% and scotopic sensitivity by 2.4% to 9.6%. Over 70% of the participants in this testing were unable to detect these changes. The expansion of technology has led to more individuals utilizing computers and televisions which increase the overall exposure to blue light. Double-blind trials however, have shown no evidence to support the use of blue light filtering lenses for digital eye strain caused by blue light from electronic screens.

Amber-tinted lenses have been shown to affect the circadian rhythm and treat delayed sleep phase disorder.

== Prevalence ==
According to the US National Institute for Occupational Safety and Health, computer vision syndrome affects about 90% of the people who spend three hours or more a day at a computer.

Another study in Malaysia was conducted on 795 university students aged between 18 and 25. The students experienced headaches along with eyestrain, with 89.9% of the students surveyed feeling any type of symptom of CVS.

== See also ==
- Asthenopia (eye strain)
- Computer-induced medical problems
- Effects of blue light technology
- Electronic media and sleep
- Forward head posture
- List of repetitive strain injury software (break reminders)
- Ocular neurosis
- Photophobia
- Repetitive strain injury
- Presbyopia
- Visual looming syndrome
- Visual snow
