= Eye strain =

Discomfort following extended visual tasks

- Other names: Asthenopia, aesthenopia, eyestrain
- Specialty: Ophthalmology
- Symptoms: Headache, blurred vision, eye discomfort, and light sensitivity

Eye strain, also medically termed asthenopia (from astheno- 'loss of strength' and -opia 'relating to the eyes'), is a common eye condition characterized by non-specific symptoms such as fatigue, pain in or around the eyes, blurred vision, headache, and double vision.

These symptoms may occur after long-term use of computers, staring at phone screens, digital devices, reading, or other activities that involve extended visual tasks. Other contributing factors include uncorrected vision problems,, environmental factors, and underlying health conditions. Eye strain may also result from increased effort by the ciliary muscles and extra-ocular muscles during prolonged visual tasks. These symptoms are broadly classified into external symptom factors (related to the ocular surface) and internal symptom factors (related to eye muscles).

Eye strain is highly prevalent among individuals engaged in prolonged near-vision tasks such as reading, writing, or digital work, with studies reporting that 50% to 90% of people experience related symptoms. Severe eye strain is linked to greater difficulty performing visual tasks and reduced efficiency in work or daily life.

A systematic review estimated that 69% of individuals experience eye strain symptoms across populations engaged in prolonged near-vision activities. Certain populations were identified as being at higher risk, including university students (76.1%), contact lens wearers (73.1%) and females (71.4%). Both behavioral and biological factors contribute to the development of eye strain.

Treatment involves environmental modifications, visual aids, and taking periodic breaks. The experience of eye strain when reading in dim light has given rise to the common misconception that such an activity causes permanent eye damage.

== Symptoms and signs ==
Eye strain's symptoms can be broken into two groups: Internal Symptom Factors (ISF) and External Symptom Factors (ESF). ESFs consist of symptoms related to dry eye such as burning and irritation, seemingly linked to the ocular surface. ISFs are related to pain and ache sensations behind the eye and are linked to accommodative and vergence stress, caused by poor visual conditions.

Symptoms of eye strain can include:

- blurred vision
- headache
- sore, irritated, burning, or itching eyes
- dry eyes or watery eyes
- eye discomfort
- difficulty concentrating
- sensitivity to bright lights

Symptoms can be grouped by affected area or underlying mechanisms:

- ocular surface (dryness, irritation, redness)
- accommodative (difficulty focusing on near objects)
- vergence (misalignment when turning eyes inward or outward)
- extra-ocular (muscle discomfort around the eyes, neck, and shoulders)

The recognition of these categories helps describe eye strain presentations and guide potential interventions.

== Causes ==
Asthenopia can result from various factors. These causes can be categorized as ocular issues, digital use patterns, environmental factors, or underlying health conditions, including:

- Uncorrected refractive errors (astigmatism, hyperopia, anisometropia, etc.)
- Eye movement coordination
- Accommodative and vergence stress
- Glare
- Flickering lights
- Allergy
- Close viewing distance
- dry eye
- Fatigue
- Upward gaze
- Prolonged reading from smartphone

== Diagnosis ==
Diagnosis of eye strain involves reviewing the patient's symptoms and medical history, followed by an eye examination. The assessment may include questions about screen use, reading habits, lighting conditions, sleep patterns, and the duration of symptoms. An eye examination may assess visual acuity, focusing ability, eye coordination, and signs of dryness or inflammation. Refraction testing may also be performed to identify uncorrected refractive errors. Other conditions, such as dry eye disease and convergence insufficiency may also be considered during the evaluation.

== Therapy ==
Given that asthenopia is caused by different factors, treatment may involve the work environment or visual conditions. One known method of relieving strain on the ocular muscles is taking periodic breaks by closing the eyes and blinking frequently. Often found in connection with digital eye strain (DES), eye strain can be reduced by following the 20–20–20 rule, which consists of looking at something 20 feet away for 20 seconds every 20 minutes.

Structured break schedules are supported by research as an effective strategy to prevent or reduce eye strain. Planned break regimens have been shown to reduce eye discomfort, decrease headaches, and improve ocular accommodation. Short, frequent breaks have been found to reduce visual fatigue more effectively than longer, less frequent ones. This makes scheduled breaks a useful strategy to mitigate eye strain.

In addition to break regimens, environmental adjustments and ergonomics can help reduce eye strain. Adjusting screen brightness and contrast, optimizing ambient lighting, and changing the color of text further improve comfort during prolonged tasks.

== See also ==
- Eye examination
- Light-on-dark color scheme
- Ocular neurosis
- Photophobia
- Vision therapy
- Visual looming syndrome
