= Task switching (psychology) =

Executive function

Task switching, or set-shifting, is an executive function that involves the ability to subconsciously shift attention between one task and another. In contrast, cognitive shifting is a very similar executive function, but it involves conscious (not subconscious) change in attention. Together, these two functions are subcategories of the broader cognitive flexibility concept.

Task switching allows a person to rapidly and efficiently adapt to different situations. It is often studied by cognitive and experimental psychologists, and can be tested experimentally using tasks like the Wisconsin Card Sorting Test. Deficits in task switching are commonly observed in patients with Parkinson's disease, and in those on the autism spectrum.

== Background and history ==
Human behavior and cognition are characterized by the ability to adapt to a dynamic environment, whether in attention, action, or both. This ability to shift attention and action adaptively has been investigated in the laboratory since the first use of the task switching paradigm by Jersild (1927). This paradigm examines the control processes that reconfigure mental resources for a change of task by requiring subjects to complete a set of simple, yet engaging interleaving operations that must be performed in an alternating or repeating sequence.

=== Switch cost ===
Performance on these tasks is disrupted when a switch from one task to another is required. This disruption is characterized by a slower performance and decrease in accuracy on a given task A on a trial that follows the performance of a different task B ("alternating" or "switch" trial) as opposed to performance on task A when it follows another trial of task A ("repetition" trial). The difference in accuracy and performance between a task repeat (A-A) and a task switch (A-B) is known as the switch cost. The switch cost remains even when there is ample warning of an upcoming switch, thus it is thought to reflect the functioning of numerous executive control processes ranging from attention shifting, goal retrieval, task set reconfiguration processes, and inhibition of prior task set.

=== Rogers and Monsell (1995) alternating-task procedure ===
This paradigm assumed that processing is the same on repetition and alternation trials but for the process of switching. Rogers and Monsell (1995) suggested that alternation trials place more demands on working memory because subjects must remember two tasks on alternation trials, but only one on repetition trials. To overcome these problems, the alternating-runs procedure was introduced in which subjects alternate between short runs of different tasks (e.g., AABBAABB). Repetitions occur within runs (e.g., AA, BB), and alternations occur between runs (e.g., AB, BA). Memory load and the requirement for monitoring is the same for repetitions and alternations.

=== Task-set ===
A task set is defined as an effective intention to perform a task, accomplished by configuring one's mental state (e.g. attention) to be in accordance with the specific operations demanded by the task. Tasks that have been used to define these task sets include: categorization of numbers, letters, or symbols; identification of colors or words (e.g., using Stroop effect stimuli); location judgments; semantic and episodic memory tasks; and arithmetic problems.

== Theories ==
=== Executive control of processing ===
==== Task-set reconfiguration ====
This theory assumes that once the task set is implemented, it stays in a given state of activation until it has to be changed, such as when a new task is presented. Consequently, proponents argue, switch costs arise from an endogenous, executive control process that reconfigures the cognitive system to implement the relevant task set for task alternations.

=== Automatic processes ===
==== Task-set inertia ====
To achieve behavioral stability in the face of interference, strongly activated task sets are needed. However, strongly activated task sets should also be particularly difficult to eliminate. Consequently, task sets persist over time and interfere proactively with the establishment of new task set configurations (see proactive interference). This residual activation of task sets in memory from the recent performance of a task can contribute to automatic influences on performing a new task beyond voluntary control. For example, it has been proposed that less-practiced tasks require more support in memory which will result in greater task set inertia and thus can be expected to produce more proactive interference resulting in larger switch costs when switching away from the less-practiced task. Future research must determine whether active or passive processes overcome task-set inertia.

==== Task-set inhibition ====
Asserts that switching between tasks requires the just-completed task to be suppressed to allow a new task to be completed. Support for the theory comes from research which has observed larger response times when returning to a task after an intermediate task than when completing three, or more, different tasks in a row—strong evidence against activation only theories. For example, for tasks A, B, and C the response times for the third task will be slower in the case of an A-B-A sequence than a C-B-A sequence. In a series of experiments it was shown that this inhibitory process is not the result of priming so it is not an automatic process. Incomplete inhibition is thought to be responsible for the residual costs that occur even after long cue-stimulus intervals.

==== Task-set priming ====
Most task-switching experiments use the same stimuli for both tasks (e.g. pictures for location judgment tasks or words for semantic judgment tasks), so the current stimuli may prime (make more available) the previous task set. Consequently, facing the same stimulus in different tasks produces cognitive costs, and it may be mainly these costs that are measured by switch costs. Studies have found that non-ambiguity of the stimuli (and non-overlap of responses) with respect to each of the possible tasks is sufficient to eliminate the costs of task switching in some cases. An important challenge for future research is to determine whether active or passive processes overcome task-set priming.

== The switch cost ==
=== Explicit task cuing to explore switch costs ===
The explicit task-cuing procedure was developed to investigate the time course of task switching. The interval between the presentation of the cue indicating which task to perform and the presentation of the target stimulus can be manipulated to demonstrate the effect of available processing time on performance.

=== Two models explain the effects of cues on switch costs ===
==== Task-switching model ====
This task-switching model assumes the role of executive control. If the cue repeats, the executive does nothing, and the target is processed in accordance with the task set from the previous trial. If the cue alternates, the executive switches tasks before processing the target. Switching takes time and creates a switch cost. Predicts equal Reaction times (RTs) for cue repetitions and task repetitions, and slower RTs for task alternations because this is the only condition where task switches actually occur.

==== Compound-stimulus model ====
This model does not assume executive control. The cue and the target jointly specify a unique response on each trial, so subjects can encode the cue and the target and choose the response associated with the compound. No task switching is required. Cues are encoded faster on repetition trials than on alternation trials because encoding benefits from repetition. Switch costs thereby reflect encoding benefits on repetition trials, not task switching, so it predicts faster Reaction times for cue repetitions than for task repetitions, and equal RTs for task repetitions and task alternations.

=== Experimental evidence ===
==== Support for no executive control ====
To distinguish the two models, the experiments used two cues for each task with three types of trials: cue repetitions, in which the current cue was the same as the previous cue; task repetitions, in which the current cue was different from the previous cue but specified the same task; and task alternations, in which the current cue was different from the previous cue and specified a different task. The data showed large reaction time differences between cue repetitions and task repetitions (same task, different cue), and negligible differences between task repetitions and task alternations, consistent with the compound-stimulus model. Thus, the switch costs observed in the explicit task-cuing procedure may not reflect executive processes.
