= Thought stopping =

Cognitive self-control skill

Thought stopping is a cognitive self-control skill that can be used to counter dysfunctional or distressing thoughts, by interrupting sequences or chains of problem responses. When used with cognitive behavioral therapy, it can act as a distraction, preventing an individual from focusing on their negative thought. Patients can replace a problematic thought with a positive one in order to reduce anxiety and worry. The procedure uses learning principles, such as counterconditioning and punishment. Thought stopping can be prescribed to address depression, panic, anxiety and addiction, among other afflictions that involve obsessive thought.

== Technique ==
The client is asked to list problematic thoughts, worries or obsessions they believe they cannot properly control. Each thought is then translated into a statement in the client's vocabulary. A thought-stopping survey schedule can also be used, through which the client rates the frequency of occurrence of 51 negative statements. The client and a trained therapist then discuss which thoughts to target and the rationale for eliminating them, as well as understanding that thought stopping can be useful in the future once learned. The therapist then instructs the client to think of the target statement and signal when the thought begins, to which the therapist then shouts, "stop!." This procedure is repeated at different intervals, all of which should cause the client to feel startled or shocked. The client is then told to try to imagine themselves yelling "stop" instead. Through practice, the negative thought should eventually disappear. Clients receive weekly checks on their technique and to ensure that thought stopping is used appropriately and effectively. Other methods include wearing a rubber band on the wrist and snapping it as punishment when the negative thought occurs. The client also replaces their problematic thought with a more positive or productive thought. The aim is for clients to be able to carry out this technique on their own, using thought stopping to reduce their problematic thoughts even after their therapy sessions have ended.

== Evidence ==
There has been much empirical evidence of the success of thought stopping in treating various cognitive problems.

=== Anxiety problems ===
Thought stopping has been found to be successful in reducing negative thinking. Participants were low-income, single mothers with children aged from 2 to 6 years, all screened and found to be at risk of depression. They underwent a cognitive-behavioral group intervention where they learnt to use thought stopping to interrupt negative thinking and replace it with a positive thought. At the end of the experiment, participants had shown a decrease in negative thinking, even 6 months after the intervention, thus improving their mental health.

In another study, two clients with preoccupying thoughts were treated with the use of thought stopping by engaging in neutral thoughts and signaling to the therapist as soon as any disturbing thought occurs. Both clients reported an improvement towards controlling their thoughts, allowing them to better engage in their regular activities.

=== Depression ===
Patients with history of depression usually have depressive ruminations which are repetitive but passive thinking about current depression symptoms, their causes, meanings and consequences. Thought stopping is believed to work to reduce such depressive thoughts. In a study on college women at high risk of depression, participants underwent group interventions for 6 weeks and were assessed for aspects of depression before and after using Beck's Depression Inventory. The intervention included thought stopping and positive affirmations, as well as relaxation techniques in order to reduce their negative thinking. Participants were found to have fewer depressive symptoms with lower scores on the inventory, even up to 18 months after the intervention.

=== Phobias ===
In the treatment of phobias, thought stopping is used to distract patients by reducing occurrence of negative thoughts towards phobic stimulus. Participants with a phobia of spiders underwent either of two conditions: having a stimulus-relevant focused conversation or a stimulus-irrelevant distracting conversation with the experimenter while looking at a live spider in a glass tray. Those in distracting conversations showed reduced fear and performed better on a Behavioural Avoidance Test than participants in the other condition.

Additionally, in a case study of two agoraphobic clients, thought stopping was used to try to reduce anxiety. Clients used an alternative method of thought stopping which aimed to induce anger or other feelings apart from anxiety. This resulted in a successful reduction of obsessional thoughts and the interruption of anxiety-producing cognition. Researchers found that it is important to address misconceptions of counterconditioning and ensure verbal reinforcement of progress throughout the procedure.

== Misconceptions ==
A big misconception of thought stopping is mistaking it for a form of thought suppression. Thought suppression just refers to trying not to think of something; this is not to be confused with thought stopping, which involves interrupting one's own cognitive patterns. Thought suppression has mainly been studied using arbitrary thoughts (such as that of a white bear) making it unrepresentative of real problematic thoughts that involve emotion, which could actually be harder to suppress. Meanwhile, studies on thought stopping have proven it to be effective against problematic cognition, showing a difference in both phenomena.

With thought suppression mainly being tested with novel thoughts and being used as an avoidance technique, the root source of problematic thoughts is not addressed and individuals are usually left to deal with the aftereffects on their own. It was also found that thought suppression creates greater anxiety and depression in individuals due to thought rebounding where the problematic thought persists more after being suppressed. This counterproductive consequence of thought suppression has made it a questionable technique that is less commonly found in therapy today. Associating thought stopping with thought suppression creates the impression that thought stopping would similarly be ineffective, which is not the case.
