= Media multitasking =

Concurrent use of multiple media streams

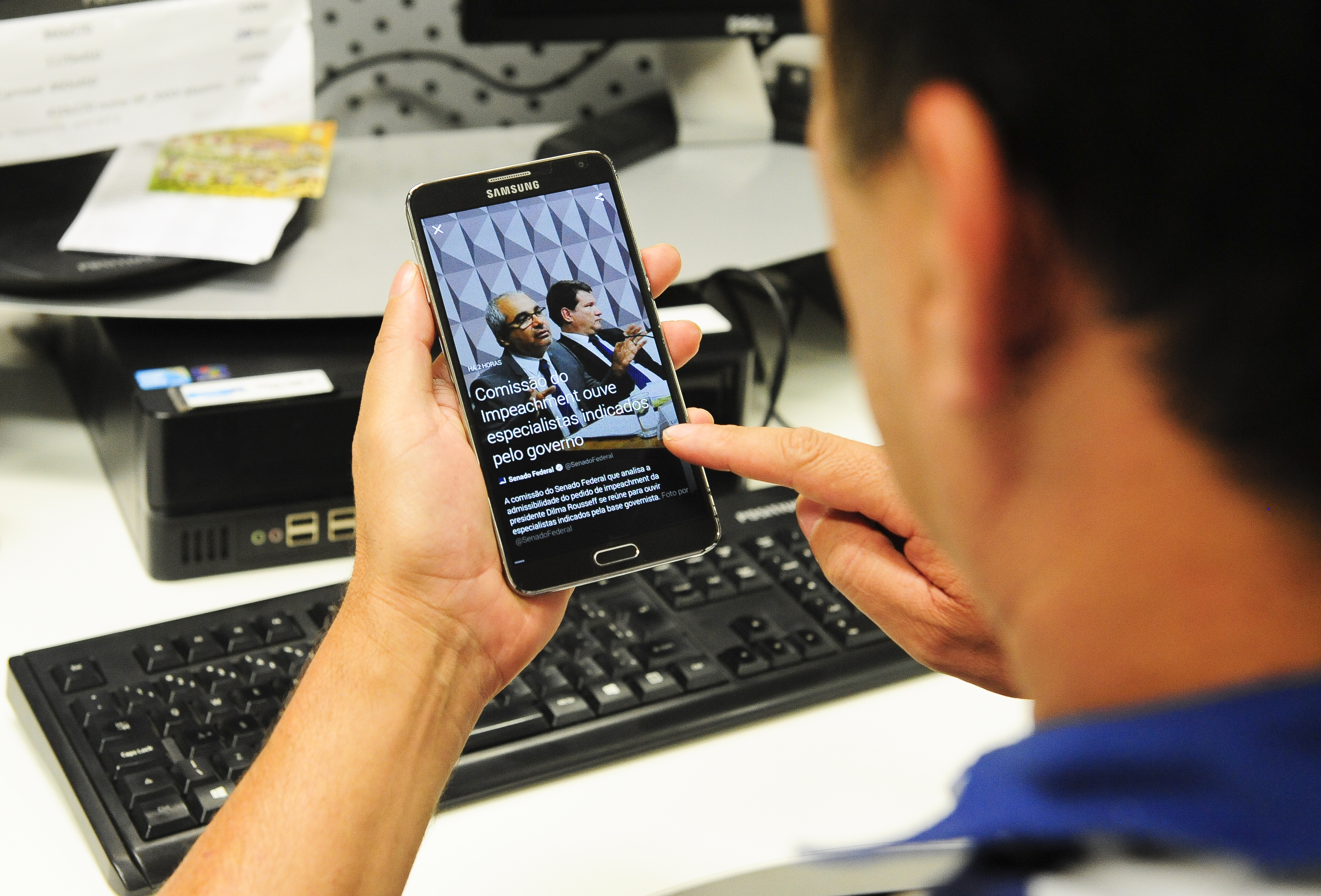
A person using a smartphone while sitting at a computer

Media multitasking is the concurrent use of multiple digital media streams. Media multitasking has been associated with depressive symptoms and social anxiety by a study involving 318 participants. A 2018 review found that while the literature is sparse and inconclusive, people who do a heavy amount of media multitasking have worse performance in several cognitive domains. One of the authors commented that while the data does not "unambiguously show that media multitasking causes a change in attention and memory," media multitasking is an inefficient practice that requires "task switching" costs including "limitations in auditory and visual processing".

In many cases, media multitasking is made up of experiences that are not necessarily intended to be combined or coordinated. For example, a user may be browsing the Web, listening to music, playing video games, using e-mail, and/or talking on the phone while watching TV. More intentionally coordinated forms of media multitasking are emerging in the form of "co-active media" and particularly "co-active TV".

== Cognitive distraction ==
A touchstone 2009 study by Stanford University used experiments to compare heavy media multitaskers to light media multitaskers in terms of their cognitive control and ability to process information. Findings from the experiment include:

1. When intentionally distracting elements were added to experiments, heavy media multitaskers were on average 0.08 seconds slower than their lighter media multitasking counterparts at identifying changes in patterns;
2. In a longer-term memory test that invited participants to recall specific elements from earlier experiments, the high multitaskers more often falsely identified the elements that had been used most frequently as intentional distractors;
3. In the presence of distracting elements, high multitaskers were 0.4 seconds slower than their counterparts to switch to new activities and 0.3 seconds slower to engage in a new section of the same activity.

The researchers concluded that heavy media multitaskers are distracted by the multiple streams of media they are consuming, and that not multitasking can help with concentration. In the "bottleneck theory" of cognitive performance, the slowing down seen when people multitask is called "interference." According to this theory, people have only a limited amount of cognitive resources, which allow them to focus and complete one task at a time. When people try to do several things at once or multitask, their performance suffers a slowdown because of a "cognitive bottleneck," like a traffic jam in the brain.

Researchers tried to disprove this theory over several decades, and although they found a handful of activities that people can do simultaneously without slowing, these activities are relatively simple and so far removed from everyday human activities that they cannot be used as support for people's ability to multitask. A team of researchers reviewed the extensive literature on multitasking and concluded that hundreds of studies show that slowing will happen when people try to multitask; in fact, many studies that were designed to show that people could multitask without interference in fact indicated the opposite. These researchers warned that when people attempt to multitask, especially when doing complex and potentially dangerous tasks (such as driving and using their cell phones to talk or text), they will always encounter the cognitive bottleneck, causing their performance to suffer in terms of speed or accuracy.

A related article, "Breadth-biased versus focused cognitive control in media multitasking behaviors," notes that the prevalence of this phenomenon leads "to a question about the required skills and expertise to function in society. A society with its ever-increasing complexity appears to move people towards juggling among multiple tasks rather than focusing on one task for a long period." The study's author suggests that further research will be necessary as the effects on society become more pronounced: "The new technologies are gearing people, especially young people who grow up with digital technologies and wired networks, toward breadth-biased information processing behavior rather than linear in-depth study behavior. Long-term exposure to media multitasking is expected to produce both positive and negative outcomes on cognitive, emotional, and social development."

=== By generation ===
Despite the research, people from younger generations report that they feel multitasking is easy, even "a way of life." They perceive themselves as good at it and spend a substantial amount of their time engaged in one form of multitasking or another (for example, watching TV while doing homework, listening to music while doing homework, or even all three things at once). By contrast, members of older generations often openly admit that they are not very good at multitasking, finding it difficult, and therefore, do not do it as often as young people.

=== In the workforce ===
Multitasking behavior in the workforce has been increasing steadily since the 1990s as people have easier, and therefore faster, access to information and communication through smart technologies that have become cheaper over time. Although multitasking behavior harms performance, the paradox is that organizational productivity is increasing at a high rate nonetheless. Concurrent with increased multitasking in the workforce and the subsequent rise in productivity and multitasking in general, literature has witnessed progressively more reports of increased stress, loss of focus, symptoms resembling attention deficit hyperactivity disorder (ADHD), and even a lowering of IQ.

=== While driving ===
Research in media multitasking in real-world settings focused mostly on using cellphones while driving. There is an overwhelming amount of evidence to show that talking on a phone while driving is very dangerous, often leading to crashes, including those fatal to both drivers and pedestrians. Just one hour of talking on a cellphone per month while driving makes a person between four and nine times more likely to crash. Meanwhile, people who text while driving are 23 times more likely to be involved in some kind of collision. A large review of studies on driving while media multitasking showed that using a hands-free phone while driving is just as dangerous as using a hand-held version, and that both can result in many different driving mistakes including missing stop signs, forgetting to reduce speed when necessary, and following too closely, among many others. Also, media multitasking while driving with other technologies, including MP3 players, voice-based email, a car's music system, and even the GPS, is just as distracting as using a phone. Talking to a person on a cellphone while driving is not the same as having a conversation with a passenger, as adult passengers (but not children) often warn the driver of possible dangers, or at least stop talking when the driving conditions are tough, to let the driver focus on the road.

== Learning ==
Students commonly use multiple portable digital technologies, including laptops, tablets and smartphones with wireless access to the Internet. Students can use technologies in the classroom to multi-task in two specific ways when given the choice: for on-task purposes that supplement learning and ease the learning task, or for off-task purposes such as entertainment or social interaction. Overall, research shows that digital technologies can enhance learning when used as educational tools, as they are affordable and extremely portable. However, research consistently shows that inappropriate multitasking with digital technologies is harmful to student performance.

=== On-task multitasking ===
Students use technology for many diverse on-task purposes including taking notes, conducting literature searches, viewing video/audio files, creating and viewing spreadsheets and PowerPoint slides, completing online tests and assignments, and even texting friends to ask questions about course material. Outside of the classroom, students frequently use technology such as instant messaging to communicate with other students, coordinate group work, share important files and homework, and form peer support groups to vent and improve motivation. Students in grade school and high school benefit most from on-task use of technology. This is largely because at the grade school and high school levels, technology is integrated into the design of the course, and teachers provide the necessary structure and supervision. Such conditions allow students to process information more deeply and apply the newly learned information to new contexts, as well as improve collaboration among students. However, university students do not generally benefit from technology. The results of one study showed no benefits to using laptops for improving student GPA (grade point average) in comparison to students who did not use laptops. Two further studies showed that students who did not use laptops outperformed those who did use laptops. Overall, there is a pattern of decreasing the effectiveness of using technology for on-task purposes from the grade school level to the university level. This appears to be due to increased freedom of use of technology, combined with lower levels of integration of specific technology in the design of specific course material. Additionally, younger students and students from financially disadvantaged backgrounds who have high levels of Internet use are at an especially high risk of under-performing.

=== Off-task multitasking ===
A large portion of students use digital technologies for off-task purposes during classroom lectures, with social networking (especially Facebook), instant messaging, texting, emailing, and web-browsing being used most commonly. Moreover, young adults multitask more than older adults and males multitask more than females for off-task purposes. The results of numerous studies show that high Internet use for off-task purposes is associated with lower GPA. One experimental study compared the impact of using 4 different technologies for off-task purposes including MSN, email, texting, and Facebook, to three control groups during real classroom lectures. The three control groups included one group of students who were free to use any amount of technologies as they wished including any on-task or off-task purposes. The other two groups were on-task note-takers who took notes either on paper, or on a laptop. The results showed that students in the MSN and Facebook conditions scored lower on a memory test than the paper notes control group. When examining the amount of multitasking instead of specific technologies, the results showed that greater levels of multitasking led to progressively lower grades. While all studies show that any kind of off-task multitasking lowers performance, some tasks impair performance more than others. Specifically, social networking is particularly bad for student performance as it leads to higher levels of unfinished assignments and lower GPAs. Moreover, off-task multitasking distracts not only the user but also neighboring students.

=== Student multitasking ===
An observational study of how students study at home examined their study habits and strategies. The results showed that most students prefer to task-switch a lot and focus for only approximately 6 minutes before reaching for their favorite digital device. Moreover, the students who enjoyed task-switching did so more often and with more technologies in comparison to students who preferred to focus on a single learning task, and who therefore did not have as many technologies readily available. Consistent with previous studies, students with a preference for focusing and those who used proper study strategies had higher GPAs than students who preferred to task-switch. Karpinski and colleagues (2013) compared multitasking behaviors of students from Europe to those of students from the U.S. They found that only the students from the U.S. were distracted by multitasking to the point that their GPA suffered. This was due to two main reasons: the U.S. students multitask more than European students and the European students, when engaging in multitasking, were more strategic in their multitasking behavior as they delayed replying to incoming messages. The concept of "digital meta cognition"—awareness of one's usage of and the effects of digital devices—has been proposed as a construct for providing a way to avoid problems with media multitasking while learning.

== See also ==
- Internet addiction disorder
- Second screen
