= Zeis =

Zeis may refer to:

- Adam Zeis (born 1978), American writer and podcaster
- Gland of Zeis sebaceous gland located on the margin of the eyelid
- Eduard Zeis (1807–1868), German surgeon and ophthalmologist

== See also ==
- Zeiss (disambiguation)
