= Eye shaving =

Alternative medical treatment practiced in China

Eye shaving (Chinese 刀锋洗眼; lit: 'blade wash eyes') is a rare traditional practice primarily observed in Chengdu, China. It involves the use of a metal blade to scrape the eyeball and eyelids, aimed at refreshing the eyes and promoting visual clarity.

== Procedure ==
Eye shaving typically begins with the practitioner holding the eyelids open using their fingers. A metal blade is then gently scraped back and forth across the eyelid and eyeball. Some practitioners may employ a small rod to manipulate the upper eyelid to further clean the area. The entire process lasts about five minutes.

According to Qu Chao, an ophthalmologist in Chengdu, the technique seems to clear the moisturizing sebaceous glands located along the edge of the eyelid. Documented for over sixty years, it was believed to help treat trachoma. The tradition is said to have been "phased out". Most individuals undergoing eye shaving are of an older generation who have used the method to care for their eyes for decades.

Anecdotal evidence from individuals who have undergone eye shaving suggests that some patients believe the treatment enhances vision clarity.

== Risks ==
Eye shaving is strongly advised against by ophthalmologists, who note that while unblocking Meibomian glands can alleviate symptoms of conditions such as dry eye syndrome and blepharitis, safer alternatives exist. Potential dangers of eye shaving include lacerations from the metal blade, increased risk of infections due to a non-sterile environment, and the possibility of long-term damage from improper techniques.
