= Meibography =

Meibography of the Human Eyelid Using Real Time Imaging Fourier Domain OCT

A meibography is an image of the morphology of the meibomian glands. Different technologies exist to perform a meibography in a non-invasive manner. Meibography is used in meibomian gland dysfunction diagnosis.

== See also ==
- Meibomian gland
- Dry eye syndrome
- Blepharitis
