= Phlyctenular keratoconjunctivitis =

- Other names: Phlyctenulosis
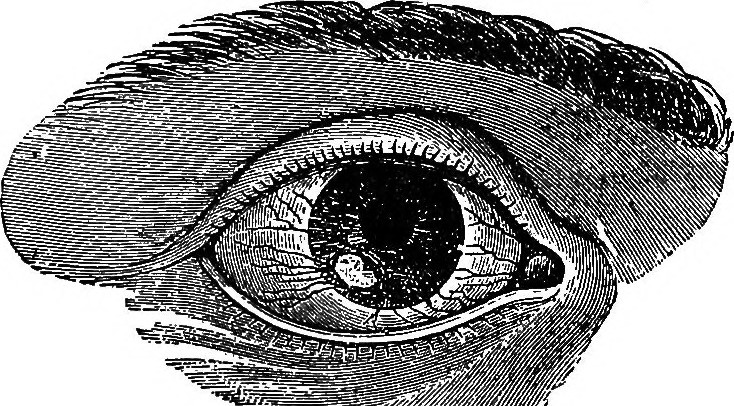
- Illustration of a corneal phlyctenule
- Specialty: Neurology

Phlyctenular keratoconjunctivitis is an inflammatory syndrome caused by a delayed (aka type-IV) hypersensitivity reaction to one or more antigens. The triggering antigen is usually a bacterial protein (particularly from Staphylococcus aureus), but may also be a virus, fungus (particularly Candida albicans), or nematode.

== Symptoms and signs ==
- Irritation
- Discomfort or pain
- Foreign-body sensation
- Tearing
- Blepharospasm
- Photophobia
- Mucopurulent discharge (rarely)

In cases where the cornea is affected, pain and photophobia are more likely, and corneal scarring can occur (potentially impairing vision).

The syndrome is marked by the appearance of characteristic lesions, known as phlyctenules, on the cornea and/or conjunctiva. These usually manifest as small (1 - 3 or 1 - 4 mm) raised nodules, pinkish-white or yellow in color, which may ulcerate (or, more rarely, necrose) and are often surrounded by dilated blood vessels. Corneal lesions are usually triangular in shape, with the base at the limbus and the apex pointing towards the center of the cornea.

== Diagnosis ==
Clinical findings of corneal lesion or corneal ulceration.

== Treatment ==
The symptoms of phlyctenular keratoconjunctivitis are primarily treated with application of an appropriate corticosteroid eye drop, such as prednisolone acetate (Pred Forte) or loteprednol (Lotemax). Loteprednol is increasingly preferred due to its lower risk of elevating intraocular pressure. The corticosteroid suppresses the immune response, reducing inflammation and improving most symptoms.

The causative agent (i.e. the source of the antigen that triggered the hypersensitive immune response) should also be identified. Staphylococcus aureus is usually the primary suspect, along with Mycobacterium tuberculosis in areas where TB is endemic, followed by Chlamydia trachomatis. Active bacterial infections may be treated with a topical antibiotic or a combination antibiotic-steroid eye drop, such as tobramycin/dexamethasone (Tobradex). An oral tetracycline antibiotic (such as doxycycline) may be used in systemic or particularly severe/intractable infections. Erythromycin may be an effective alternative, especially in pediatric cases where the side effects of tetracyclines are unacceptable.

Artificial tears can reduce dryness and discomfort from corneal lesions. Photophobic discomfort can be mitigated with dark sunglasses.

== See also ==
- Blepharitis
- Allergic conjunctivitis
- Conjunctivitis
- Keratitis
- Keratoconjunctivitis
- Corneal abrasion
