= Moll's gland =

Modified apocrine sweat gland on the margin of the eyelid

Gland of Moll

Details

Identifiers
- Latin: glandulae ciliares conjunctivales
- TA98: A15.2.07.043
- TA2: 6834
- FMA: 59159

Moll's gland, also known as the gland of Moll or ciliary gland, is a modified apocrine sweat gland that is found on the margin of the eyelid. They are next to the base of the eyelashes, and anterior to the meibomian glands within the distal eyelid margin. These glands are relatively large and tubular-shaped. The glands of Moll are named after Dutch oculist Jacob Anton Moll (1832–1914).

Glands of Moll empty into the adjacent lashes. Glands of Moll and Zeis secrete sebum that keeps lashes supple.

The glands of Moll are prone to infection and blockage of its duct with sebum and cell debris. Blockage of the gland's duct causes swelling which can manifest itself as a stye.

== See also ==
- Meibomian gland
- List of specialized glands within the human integumentary system
- List of distinct cell types in the adult human body
