= Chalazion =

Inflammatory swelling of the eyelid due to meibomian gland blockage

- Other names: Meibomian cyst, Meibomian cyst lipogranuloma
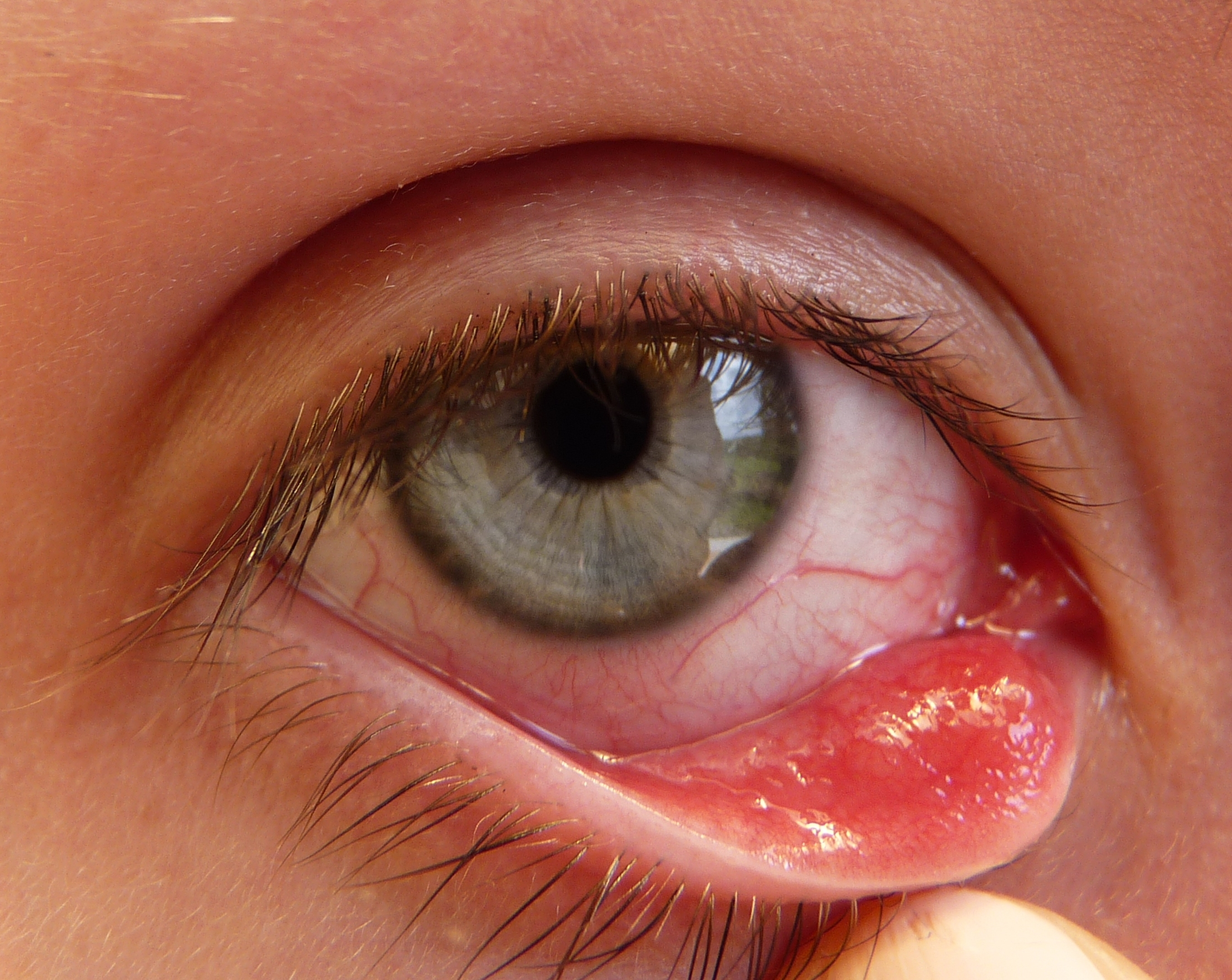
- Eyelid affected by a chalazion
- Pronunciation: /kəˈleɪziən/
- Specialty: Ophthalmology, optometry
- Symptoms: Red, is not painful cyst in middle of the eyelid
- Usual onset: Gradually over a few weeks
- Differential diagnosis: Stye, cellulitis
- Treatment: Warm compresses, steroid injection, surgery
- Frequency: Unknown

A chalazion (/kəˈleɪziən/; plural chalazia or chalazions) or meibomian cyst is not a cyst but a granuloma in the eyelid that results from a blocked meibomian gland. It typically occurs in the middle of the eyelid, is red, and is not painful. They tend to develop gradually over a few weeks.

A chalazion may occur following a stye or from hardened oils blocking the gland. The blocked gland is usually the meibomian gland, but can also be the gland of Zeis.

A stye and cellulitis may appear similar. A stye, however, is usually more sudden in onset, painful, and occurs at the edge of the eyelid. Cellulitis is also typically painful.

Treatment is initiated with warm compresses. In addition, antibiotic/corticosteroid eyedrops or ointment may be used. If this is not effective, injecting corticosteroids into the lesion may be tried. If the granuloma is large, incision and drainage may be recommended. While relatively common, the frequency of the condition is unknown. It is most common in people 30–50 years of age, and equally common in males and females. The term is from Ancient Greek χαλάζιον (khalazion) 'small hailstone'.

== Signs and symptoms ==
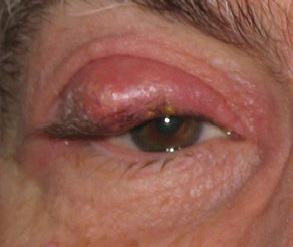
Eyelid affected by a large chalazion

The presentation is as follows:

- Painless swelling on the eyelid
- Eyelid tenderness typically none-to-mild
- Increased tearing
- Heaviness of the eyelid
- Redness of conjunctiva

=== Complications ===
A large chalazion can cause astigmatism due to pressure on the cornea.

As laser eye surgery involves shaping the cornea by burning parts of it away, weakening its structure, post-operation people can be left predisposed to deformation of the cornea from small chalazia.

Complications of corticosteroid injection include hypopigmentation and fat atrophy which is less likely to occur in conjunctival approach of injection.

A chalazion that reoccurs in the same area may rarely be a symptom of sebaceous carcinoma.

== Diagnosis ==
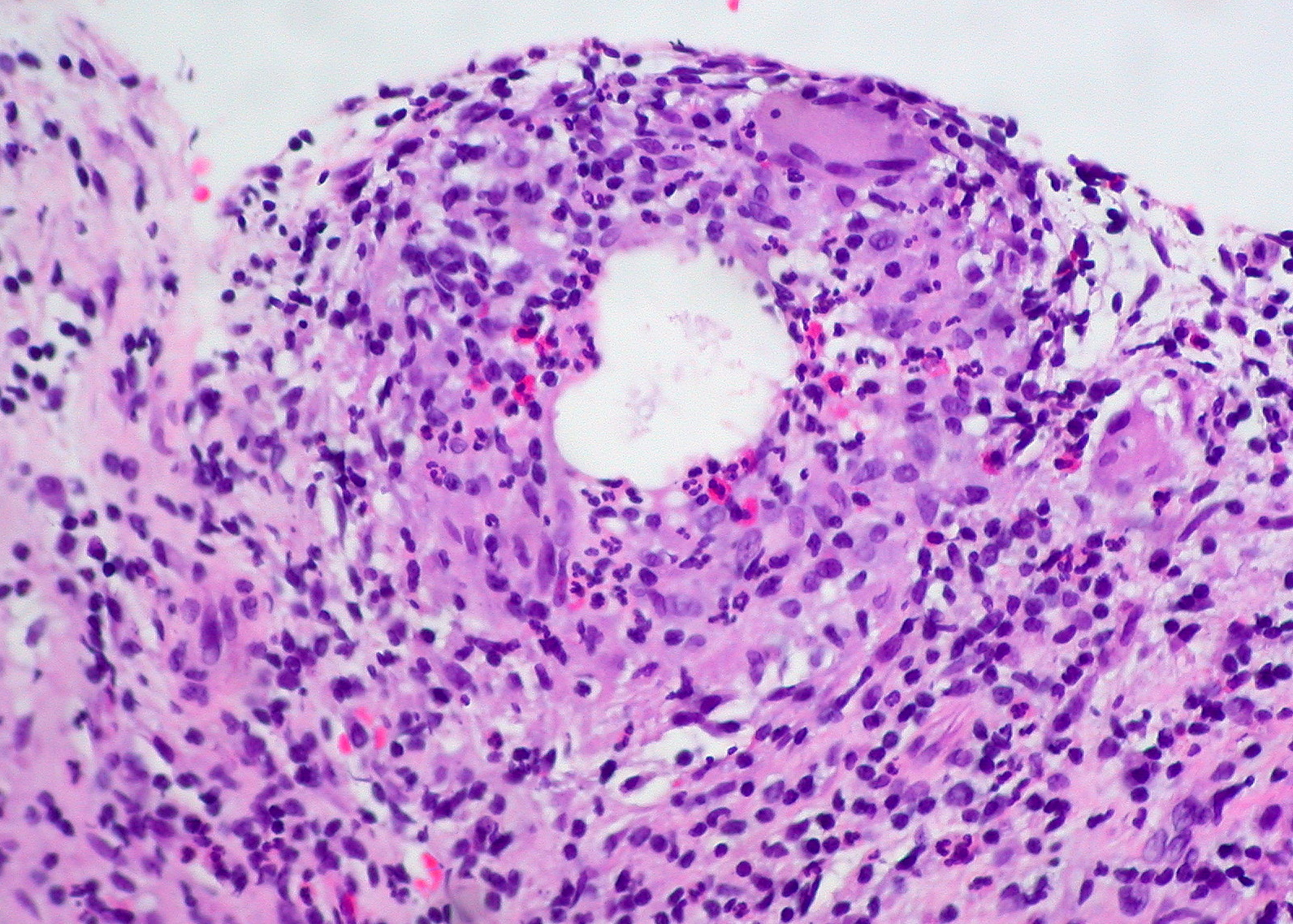
Classic lipogranulomatous response seen in a well-developed chalazion

A chalazion or meibomian cyst can sometimes be mistaken for a stye.

=== Differential diagnosis ===
The DDx is as follows:

- Sebaceous gland adenoma
- Sebaceous gland carcinoma
- Sarcoid granuloma
- Foreign body granuloma

== Treatment ==
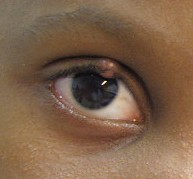
A chalazion on an upper eyelid

=== General treatment ===
Chalazia will often disappear without further treatment within a few months, and virtually all will resorb within two years.

Healing can be facilitated by applying a moist warm compress to the affected eye for approximately 10–15 minutes, 4 times per day. This promotes opening, drainage, and healing by softening the hardened oil that is occluding the duct. In addition, it is helpful to scrub the lid margin (at the base of the eyelashes) with a washcloth and mild (baby) shampoo, which removes oily debris.

Topical antibiotic eye drops or ointment (e.g., chloramphenicol or fusidic acid) are sometimes used for the initial acute infection, but are otherwise of little value in treating a chalazion.

If they continue to enlarge or fail to settle within a few months, smaller lesions can be injected with a corticosteroid.

Larger ones can be surgically removed using local anesthesia. This is usually done from underneath the eyelid to avoid a scar on the skin. If the chalazion is located directly under the eyelid's outer tissue, however, an excision from above may be more advisable so as not to inflict any unnecessary damage on the lid itself. Eyelid epidermis usually mends well, without leaving any visible scar. Depending on the chalazion's texture, the excision procedure varies: while fluid matter can easily be removed under minimal invasion, by merely puncturing the chalazion and exerting pressure upon the surrounding tissue, hardened matter usually necessitates a larger incision, through which it can be scraped out. Any residual matter should be metabolized in the course of the subsequent healing process, generally aided by regular appliance of dry heat. The excision of larger chalazia may result in visible hematoma around the lid, which will wear off within three or four days, whereas the swelling may persist for longer. Chalazion excision is an ambulant treatment and normally does not take longer than fifteen minutes. Nevertheless, owing to the risks of infection and severe damage to the eyelid, such procedures should only be performed by a medical professional.

Chalazia may recur, and they will usually be biopsied to rule out the possibility of a tumour.

=== Antibiotic/corticosteroid eyedrops or ointment ===
A limited course of topical antibiotic/corticosteroid combination eyedrops or ointment such as tobramycin/dexamethasone may be effective in treating a chalazion.

=== Surgery ===
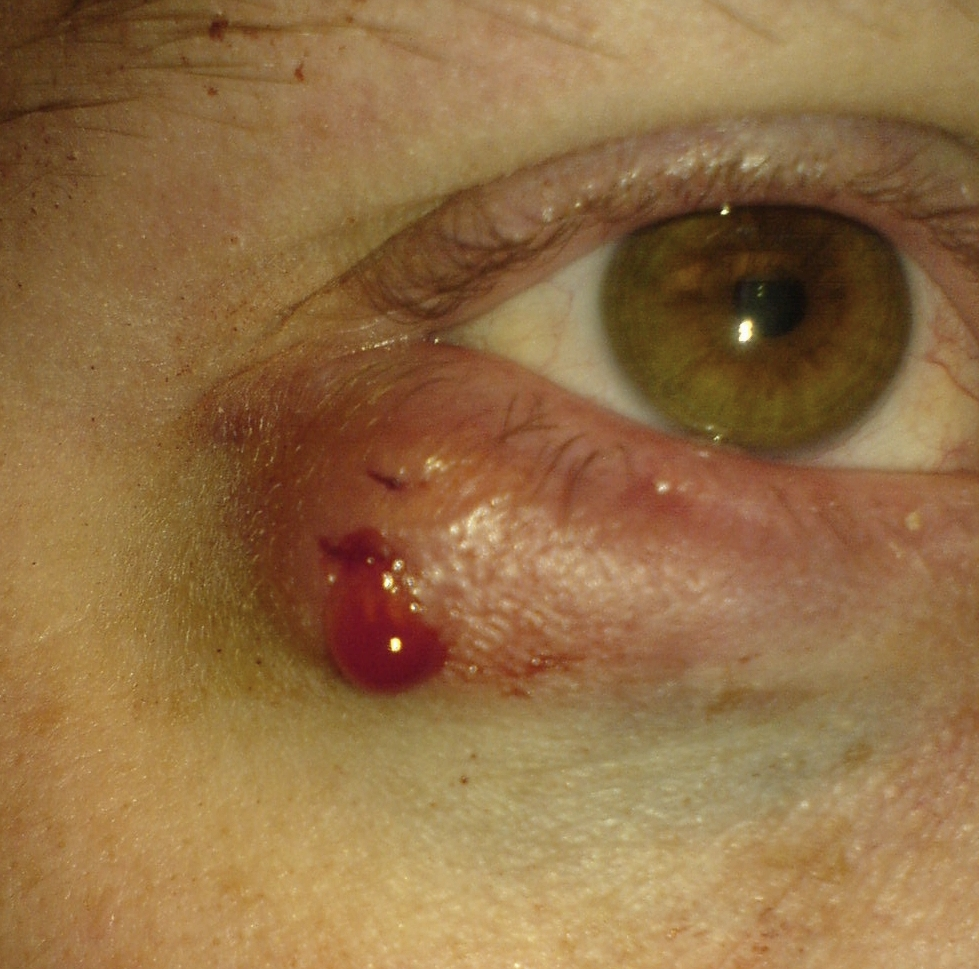
A large chalazion ca. 20 minutes upon excision. This bipartite chalazion was removed via two separate incisions. Further, along the lower eyelid, signs of chronic inflammation (blepharitis) are visible.

Chalazion surgery is a simple procedure that is generally performed as a day operation, and the person does not need to remain in the hospital for further medical care. The eyelid is injected with a local anesthetic, a clamp is put on the eyelid, then the eyelid is turned over, an incision is made on the inside of the eyelid, and the chalazion is drained and scraped out with a curette. A scar on the upper lid can cause discomfort as some people feel the scar as they blink. As surgery damages healthy tissue (e.g., by scarring tissue or possibly even causing blepharitis), given other options, less invasive treatment is preferable.

Chalazion removal surgery is performed under local or general anesthesia. Commonly, general anesthesia is administered in children to make sure they stay still and no injury to the eye occurs. Local anesthesia is used in adults and it is applied with a small injection into the eyelid. The discomfort of the injection is minimized with the help of an anesthetic cream, which is applied locally.

The chalazion can be removed in two ways, depending on the size of cyst. Relatively small chalazia are removed through a small cut at the back of the eyelid. The surgeon lifts the eyelid to access the back of its surface and makes an incision of approximately 3mm just on top of the chalazion. The lump is then removed, and pressure is applied for a few minutes to stop any oozing of blood that may occur because of the operation. Surgery of small chalazia does not require stitches, as the cut is at the back of the eyelid and therefore the cut cannot be seen, and the cosmetic result is excellent.

Larger chalazia are removed through an incision in front of the eyelid. Larger chalazia usually push on the skin of the eyelid, and this is the main reason why doctors prefer removing them this way. The incision is not usually larger than 3mm and it is made on top of the chalazion. The lump is removed and then pressure is applied to the incision to prevent oozing. This type of surgery is closed with very fine stitches. They are hardly visible and are usually removed within a week after the surgery has been performed. Although chalazia are rarely dangerous, it is common to send the chalazion or part of it to a laboratory to screen for cancer.

When surgery for a chalazion is considered, people who take aspirin or any other blood-thinning medications are advised to stop taking them one week prior to the procedure as they may lead to uncontrollable bleeding.

In rare cases, people are kept overnight in the hospital after chalazion surgery. This includes cases in which complications occurred and the person needs to be closely monitored. In most cases, however, people are able to go home after the operation has ended.

The recovery process is easy and quite fast. Most people with chalazion experience some very minor discomfort in the eye, which can be easily controlled by taking painkilling medication. People are, however, recommended to avoid getting water in the eye for up to 10 days after surgery. They may wash, bathe, or shower, but they must be careful to keep the area dry and clean. Makeup may be worn after at least one month post-operatively. People are recommended to not wear contact lenses in the affected eye for at least eight weeks to prevent infections and potential complications.

Commonly, people receive eye drops to prevent infection and swelling in the eye and pain medication to help them cope with the pain and discomfort in the eyelid and eye. One can use paracetamol (acetaminophen) rather than aspirin to control the pain. Also, after surgery, a pad and protective plastic shield are used to apply pressure on the eye in order to prevent leakage of blood after the operation; this may be removed 6 to 8 hours after the procedure.

People who undergo chalazion surgery are normally asked to visit their eye surgeon for post-op follow-up three to four weeks after surgery has been performed.

Chalazion surgery is a safe procedure and complications seldom occur. Serious complications that require another operation are also very rare. Among potential complications, there are infection, bleeding, or the recurrence of the chalazion.

=== Steroid injection ===
Because the inflammatory cells of chalazia are sensitive to steroids, intralesional or subcutaneous injection of soluble steroids, commonly 0.1 to 0.2 ml of triamcinolone acetonide (TA) into the lesion's center one or two times, is one option. The success rate is in the 77% to 93% range. It carries a quite small risk of central retinal artery obstruction, focal depigmentation in dark-skinned patients, and inadvertent ocular penetration. It is considered a simple and effective treatment option, one with high success rates. It may give the same results as surgical treatment (I&C). Larger, long-standing lesions are best treated surgically. Considering the surgical risks, steroid injection is believed to be a safer procedure in marginal lesions and lesions close to lacrimal punctum.

One injection alone has a success rate of about 80%; if requested, a second injection can be given 1–2 weeks later.

=== Carbon dioxide laser ===
Chalazion excision using a CO_{2} laser is also a safer procedure, with minimal bleeding and no eye patching required.

== See also ==
- Stye
