= Hospital furunculosis =

- Specialty: Dermatology

Hospital furunculosis is a cutaneous condition that can be epidemic in the hospital setting, characterized histopathologically by a deep abscess with both lymphocytes and neutrophils.

== See also ==
- Furunculosis
- Skin lesion
