= Stye =

Swelling of the eyelid due to infection of an oil gland

- Other names: Sty, hordeolum
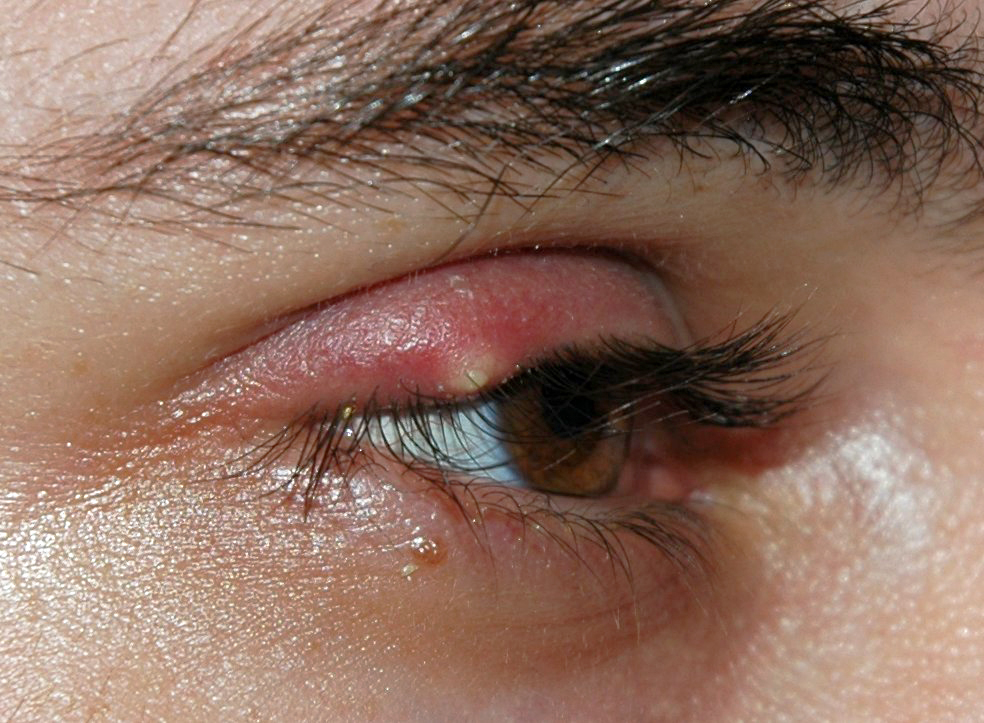
- An external stye on the upper eyelid
- Pronunciation: Stye /staɪ/, hordeolum /hɔːrˈdiːələm/
- Specialty: Ophthalmology, optometry
- Symptoms: Red tender bump at the edge of the eyelid
- Usual onset: Any age
- Duration: Few days or weeks
- Causes: bacterial infection by Staphylococcus aureus
- Differential diagnosis: Chalazion
- Treatment: Warm compresses, antibiotic eye ointment

A stye, also known as a hordeolum, is a bacterial infection of an oil gland in the eyelid. This results in a red tender bump at the edge of the eyelid. The outside or the inside of the eyelid can be affected.

The cause of a stye is usually a bacterial infection by Staphylococcus aureus. Internal styes are due to infection of the meibomian gland while external styes are due to an infection of the gland of Zeis. A chalazion, on the other hand, is a blocked meibomian gland without infection. A chalazion is typically in the middle of the eyelid and is not painful.

Often, a stye will go away without any specific treatment in a few days or weeks. Recommendations to speed improvement include warm compresses. Occasionally antibiotic eye ointment may be recommended. While these measures are often recommended, there is little evidence for use in internal styes. The frequency at which styes occur is unclear; they may occur at any age.

== Signs and symptoms ==
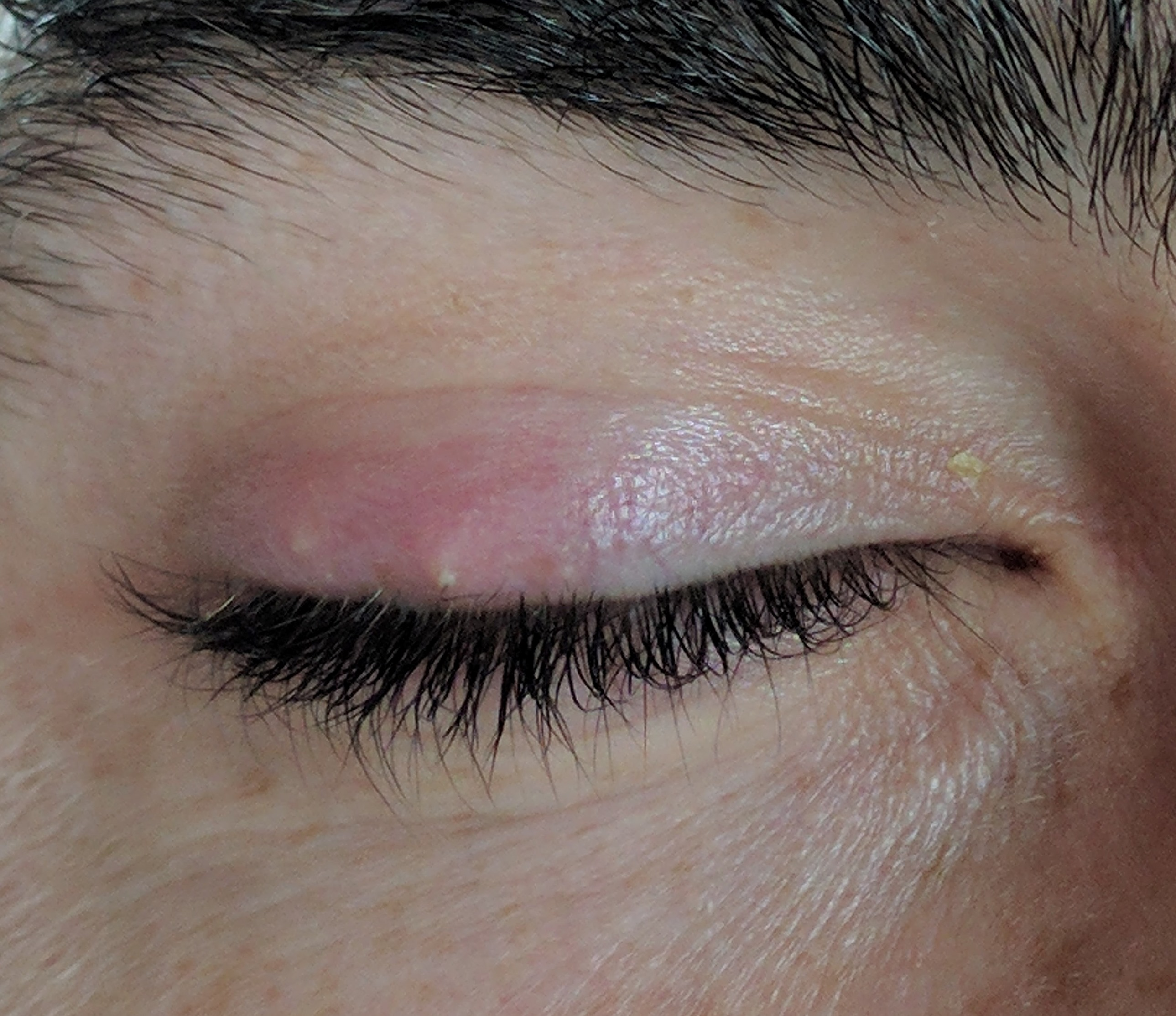
Stye of the upper eyelid

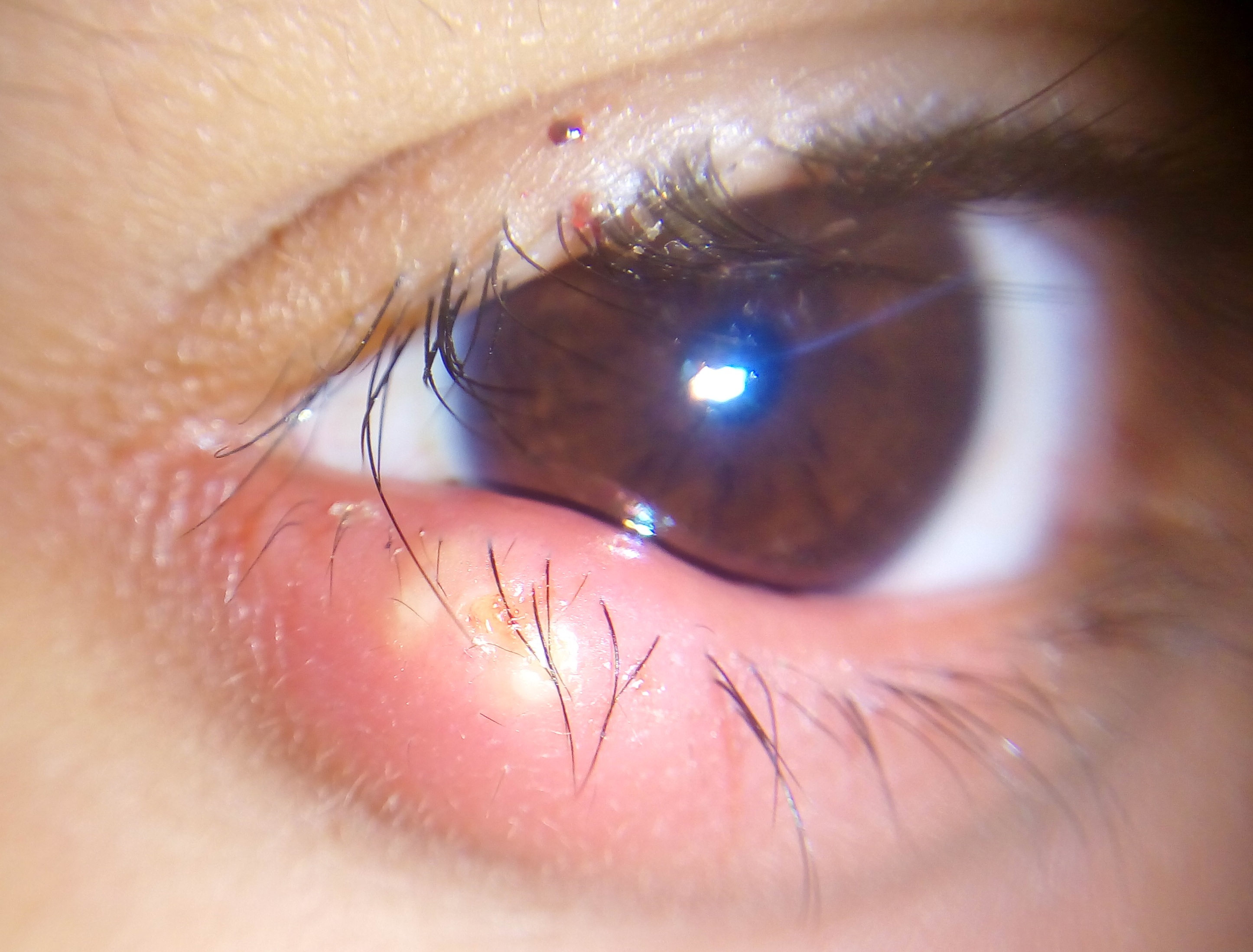
8-year-old boy with an external hordeolum of lower lid

The first sign of a stye is a small, yellowish spot at the center of the bump that develops as pus and expands in the area.

Other stye symptoms may include:

- A lump on the top or bottom eyelid
- Localized swelling of the eyelid
- Localized pain
- Redness
- Tenderness
- Crusting of the eyelid margins
- Burning in the eye
- Droopiness of the eyelid
- Scratchy sensation on the eyeball (itching)
- Blurred vision
- Mucous discharge in the eye
- Irritation of the eye
- Light sensitivity
- Tearing
- Discomfort during blinking
- Sensation of a foreign body in the eye

=== Complications ===
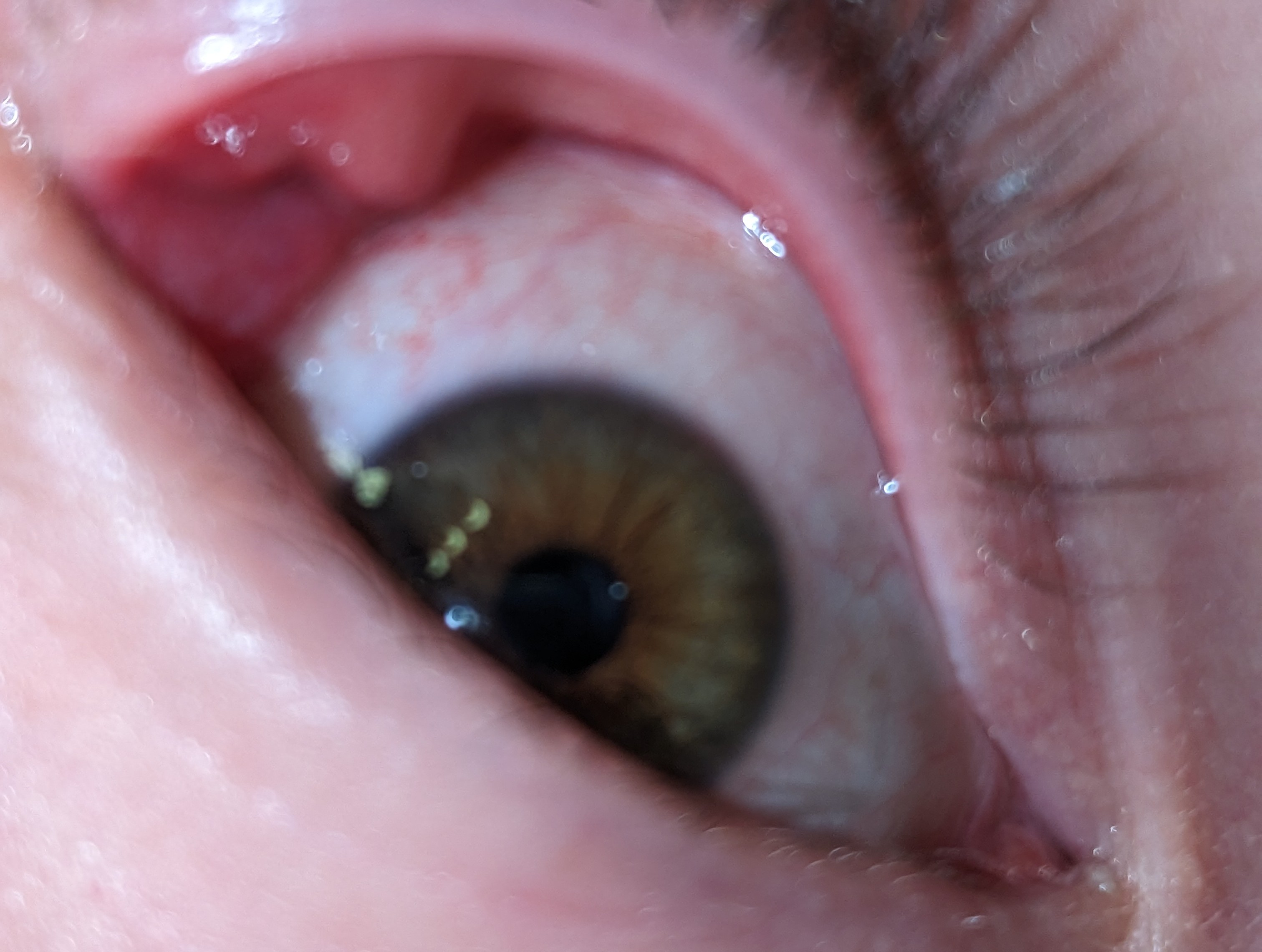
Internal stye of upper eyelid

Stye complications occur in very rare cases. However, the most frequent complication of styes is progression to a chalazion that causes cosmetic deformity, corneal irritation, and often requires surgical removal. Complications may also arise from the improper surgical lancing, and mainly consist of disruption of lash growth, lid deformity, or lid fistula. Large styes may interfere with one's vision.

Eyelid cellulitis is another potential complication of eye styes, which is a generalized infection of the eyelid. Progression of a stye to a systemic infection (spreading throughout the body) is extremely rare, and only a few instances of such spread have been recorded.

== Cause ==
A stye is caused by bacterial infection. Staphylococcus aureus bacteria cause about 95% of cases. The infection blocks an oil gland at the base of the eyelash. Styes can infect people of all ages. Causes include malnutrition, sleep deprivation, poor hygiene, lack of water, and rubbing the eyes. Styes can also be secondary to blepharitis or immunoglobulin deficiency.

== Prevention ==
Stye prevention is closely related to proper hygiene. Proper hand washing can reduce the risks of developing not only styes, but also many other types of infections.

Upon awakening, application of a warm washcloth to the eyelids for one to two minutes may be beneficial in decreasing the occurrence of styes by liquefying the contents of the oil glands of the eyelid and thereby preventing blockage.

To prevent styes, cosmetics and cosmetic eye tools should not be shared among people. Like with all infections, regular hand washing is essential, and the eyes should not be rubbed or touched with unclean hands. Contaminated eye makeup should be discarded, and sharing of washcloths or face towels should be curtailed to avoid spreading the infection between individuals. Breaking the stye may spread bacteria contained in the pus and should be avoided.

== Treatment ==
Most cases of styes resolve on their own within one to two weeks, without professional care. The primary treatment is application of warm compresses. As a part of self-care at home, people may cleanse the affected eyelid with tap water or with a mild, nonirritating soap or shampoo (such as baby shampoo) to help clean crusted discharge. Cleansing must be done gently and while the eyes are closed to prevent eye injuries.

People with styes should avoid eye makeup (e.g., eyeliner), lotions, and contact lenses, since these can aggravate and spread the infection (sometimes to the cornea). People are advised not to lance the stye themselves, as serious infection can occur. Pain relievers such as ibuprofen may be used.

=== Antibiotics ===
Evidence for the use of antibiotic eye ointment is poor. Occasionally erythromycin ophthalmic ointment is recommended. Other antibiotics, such as chloramphenicol or amoxicillin may also be used. Chloramphenicol is used successfully in many parts of the world, but contains a black box warning in the United States due to concerns about aplastic anemia, which on rare occasions can be fatal.

=== Procedures ===
An incision and drainage procedure is performed if resolution does not begin in the next 48 hours after warm compresses are started. Medical professionals will sometimes lance a particularly persistent or irritating stye with a needle to accelerate its draining.

Surgery is the last resort in stye treatment. Styes that do not respond to any type of therapies are usually surgically removed. Stye surgery is performed by an ophthalmologist, and generally under local anesthesia. The procedure consists of making a small incision on the inner or outer surface of the eyelid, depending if the stye is pointing externally or not. After the incision is made, the pus is drained out of the gland, and very small sutures are used to close the lesion. Sometimes the removed stye is sent for a histopathological examination to investigate possibility of skin cancer.

=== Alternative medicine ===
A 2017 Cochrane review found low-certainty, low-quality evidence that acupuncture may help in treating styes compared with antibiotics or warm compresses and that acupuncture plus conventional treatment may improve outcomes, though the authors could not rule out placebo effect or observer effect because the reviewed studies lacked positive control, were not blinded, or both.

== Prognosis ==
Although styes are harmless in most cases and complications are very rare, styes often recur. They do not cause intraocular damage, meaning they do not affect the eye. Styes normally heal on their own by rupturing within a few days to a week causing the relief of symptoms, but if one does not improve or it worsens within two weeks, a doctor's opinion should be sought. Few people require surgery as part of stye treatment. With adequate treatment, styes tend to heal quickly and without complications.

The prognosis is better if one does not attempt to squeeze or puncture the stye, as infection may spread to adjacent tissues. Also, patients are recommended to call a doctor if they encounter problems with vision, the eyelid bump becomes very painful, the stye bleeds or reoccurs, or the eyelid or eyes becomes red.

== Etymology ==
The word stye (first recorded in the 17th century) is probably a back-formation from styany (first recorded in the 15th century), which in turn comes from styan plus eye, the former of which in turn comes from the Old English stīġend, meaning "riser", from the verb stīgan, "to rise". The older form styan is still used in Ulster Scots today.

The homonym sty found in the combination pigsty has a slightly different origin, namely it comes from the Old English stiġ-fearh—fearh (farrow) is the Old English word for "piglet"—where stiġ meant "hall" (cf. steward), possibly an early Old Norse loanword, which could be cognate with the word stīgan above.

The synonymous late Latin expression is hordeolum, a modulation of the word hordeolus, which is related to hordeum ("barley"), after its resemblance to a barleycorn. In Czech, a sty is called ječné zrno (from ječmen "barley" and zrno "seed or grain"); in German, it is called Gerstenkorn (barleycorn). In Hebrew it is called שעורה Seh-oh-Ráh ("barley"). In Polish it is called jęczmień ("barley"), in Russian ячмень yachmen ("barley"). In Hungarian it is called árpa ("barley"). In Turkish it is called arpacık (small barley, barleylet)

== See also ==
- Boil
