= List of glands of the human body =

This article contains a list of glands of the human body

== List of endocrine and exocrine glands ==
#	Name(s)	Location	Product	Structure
1	Apocrine sweat glands	skin		coiled tubular
2	Anterior lingual glands	tongue, near tip	nonserous or mixed	
3	Brunner's glands,	duodenum	mucous	compound tubular
4	Submucosal glands,	lungs	mucous	
5	Bulbourethral glands, Cowper's glands,	penis, base	pre-ejaculate	tubulo-alveolar
6	Ceruminous glands	ear	cerumen	
7	Accessory lacrimal glands, Ciaccio's glands	eye	tears	
8	Ebner's glands	tongue	serous	
9	Eccrine sweat glands	skin		coiled tubular
10	Esophageal glands	esophagus	mucous	racemose
11	Exocrine pancreas	pancreas	serous	tubulo-acinar
12	Gastric chief cell,	stomach	serous	
13	Glomus coccygeum, coccygeal gland, Luschka's gland or gangliona	coccyx, near the tip		
14	Goblet cells	digestive tract, respiratory tract	mucous	simple unicellular
15	Henle's glands	eyelids, in the conjunctiva		tubular
16	Krause's glands	conjunctiva, middle portion	mucous	
17	Lieberkuhn's glands	intestines, surface of mucous membrane	digestive enzymes	simple tubular
18	Littré's glands, Morgagni's glands	spongy portion of the urethra	mucous	racemose
19	Lumbar glands	abdomen, near the back		
20	Mammary gland	breast	milk	compound tubulo-acinar
21	Meibomian gland	eyelids	sebaceous	
22	Moll's glands	eyelids	sebum	
23	Montgomery's glands	mammary areola	sebaceous	
24	Naboth's glands	cervix and os uteri	mucous	
25	Olfactory glands, Bowman's glands	nose, olfactory region	mucous	
26	Paneth cells	small intestine	serous	
27	Gley's glands, Sandstroem's glands, parathyroid gland	in the neck	parathyroid hormone	
28	Parietal cell	stomach	hydrochloric acid, intrinsic factor	dynamic canaliculi
29	Parotid gland	mouth	saliva	tubulo-alveolar
30	Peyer's patches (or glands)	ileum, lymphatic glands		
	Pineal gland	brain	melatonin	
31	Prostate	surrounds the urethra just below the urinary bladder		tubulo-alveolar
32	Pyloric glands	antrum of the pylorus, stomach	mucous, gastrin	simple branched tubular
33	Sebaceous gland	skin	sebum	acinar - branched
34	Skene's gland, lesser vestibular gland, paraurethral gland	vestibule of the vulva, around the lower end of the urethra	serous	tubulo-alveolar
35	Sublingual gland, Rivini's gland	mouth	mucus (primarily)	tubulo-alveolar
36	Submandibular gland	mouth	mixed (M+S)	tubulo-alveolar
37	Sudoriparous glands, Boerhaave's glands	skin		
38	Sigmund's glands	epitrochlear lymph nodes of axilla		
39	Suzanne's gland	mouth, beneath the alveolo-lingual groove	mucous	
40	Tiedmann's glands, Bartholin's glands, vulvovaginal glands	vulva, vagina		
41	Tubarial glands	posterior nasopharynx, over the torus tubarius	saliva	
42	Uterine glands	uterus	histotroph (uterine milk)	tubular
43	Weber's glands	tongue	mucous	tubular
44	Glands of Zeis	eyelids, free edges	sebaceous	

== Skin ==
There are several specialized glands within the human integumentary system that are derived from apocrine or sebaceous gland precursors. There are no specialized variants of eccrine glands.

Specialized glands within the human integumentary system
#	Name	Precursor gland derived from	Anatomic location
1	Ceruminous gland	Apocrine	Ear canal
2	Mammary gland	Apocrine	Breast
3	Moll's gland	Apocrine	Eyelid margin
4	Tyson's gland	Sebaceous	Genital skin
5	Meibomian gland	Sebaceous	Tarsal plate
6	Gland of Zeis	Sebaceous	Associated with eyelashes on eyelid margin
7	Montgomery gland	Sebaceous	Areola
8	Fordyce spot	Sebaceous	Vermillion border

== Endocrine glands ==
See List of human endocrine organs and actions
