= Zeiss =

Zeiss or Zeiß may refer to:

== People ==
- Carl Zeiss (1816–1888), German optician and entrepreneur
- Emil Zeiß (1833–1910), German Protestant minister and painter
- Juan Pablo Zeiss (born 1989), Argentine rugby union player
- Mary Zeiss Stange (1950–2024), American academic

== Companies ==
- Carl Zeiss Foundation, holding company for several Zeiss companies
- Carl Zeiss Meditec AG, a Zeiss subsidiary
- Carl Zeiss SMT, a Zeiss subsidiary
- Schott AG, a Zeiss subsidiary
- Zeiss (company), German manufacturer of optics, industrial measurements and medical devices founded by Carl Zeiss

== Institutions and organizations ==
- Carl-Zeiss-Gymnasium Jena, a school in Jena, Germany.
- FC Carl Zeiss Jena, football club founded in 1903 by workers at Carl Zeiss optics company

== Technologies ==
- Zeiss formula, a formula for depth of field calculations.
- Zeiss projector, a line of planetarium projectors manufactured by one of the Zeiss companies
- Zeiss Planar, a photographic lens patented by the Zeiss company in 1896
- Zeiss Sonnar, a photographic lens patented by the Zeiss company in 1929
- Zeiss Tessar, a photographic lens patented by the Zeiss company in 1902

== Other uses ==
- 851 Zeissia, an S-type asteroid named for Carl Zeiss
- Zeiss (comics), DC Comics villain

== See also ==
- Zeis (disambiguation)
