= Boil (infection) =

Medical condition (infection)

Boils
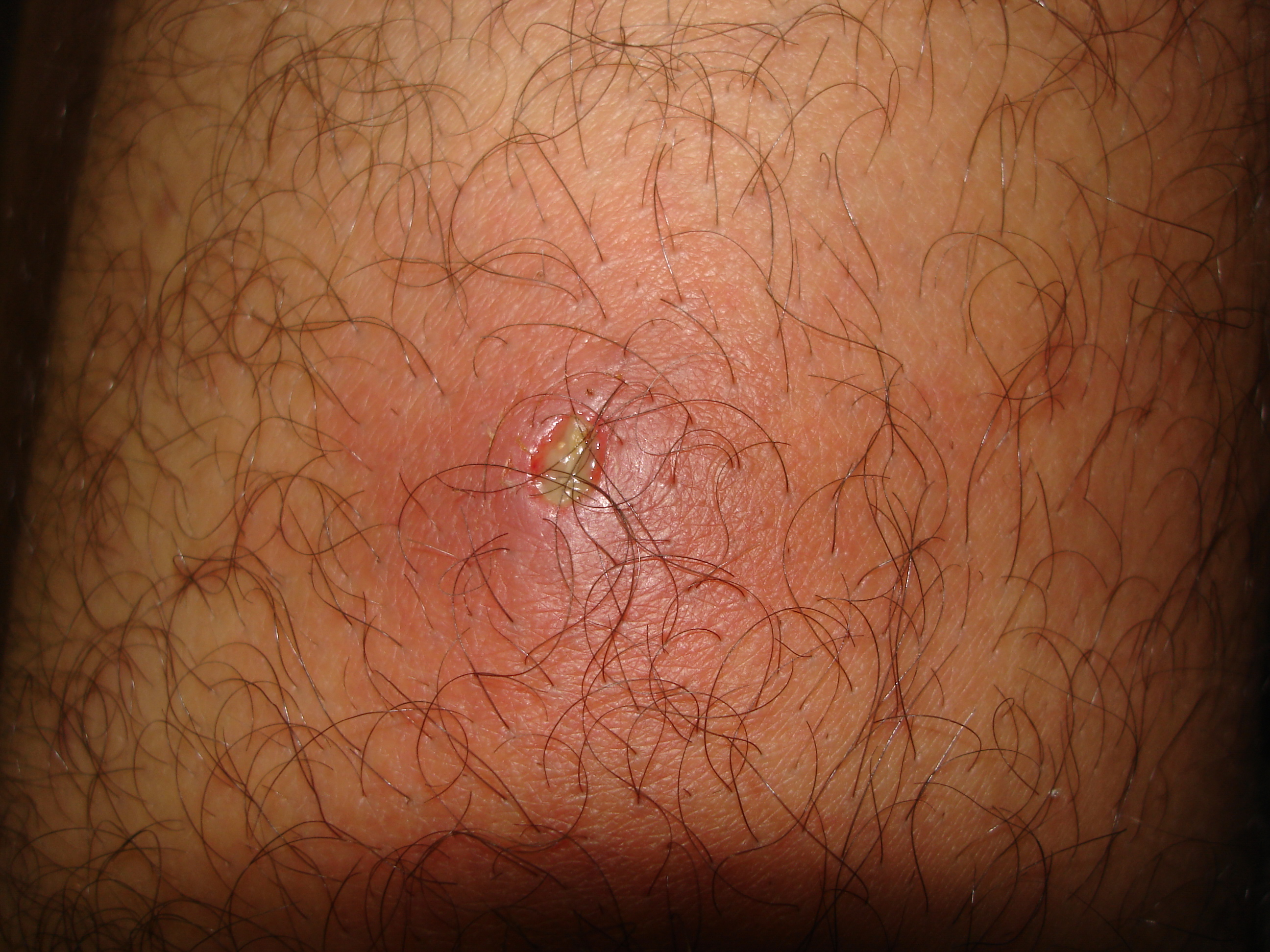
- Furuncle
- Specialty: Dermatology; general surgery
- Symptoms: Painful; small; rough skin growth
- Causes: Bacteria; ingrown hair

A boil, also called a furuncle, is a deep folliculitis, which is an infection of the hair follicle. It is most commonly caused by infection by the bacterium Staphylococcus aureus, resulting in a painful swollen area on the skin caused by an accumulation of pus and dead tissue. Boils are fundamentally pus-filled nodules. Individual boils clustered together are called carbuncles. Most human infections are caused by coagulase-positive S. aureus strains, notable for the bacteria's ability to produce coagulase, an enzyme that can clot blood. Almost any organ system can be infected by S. aureus.

== Signs and symptoms ==
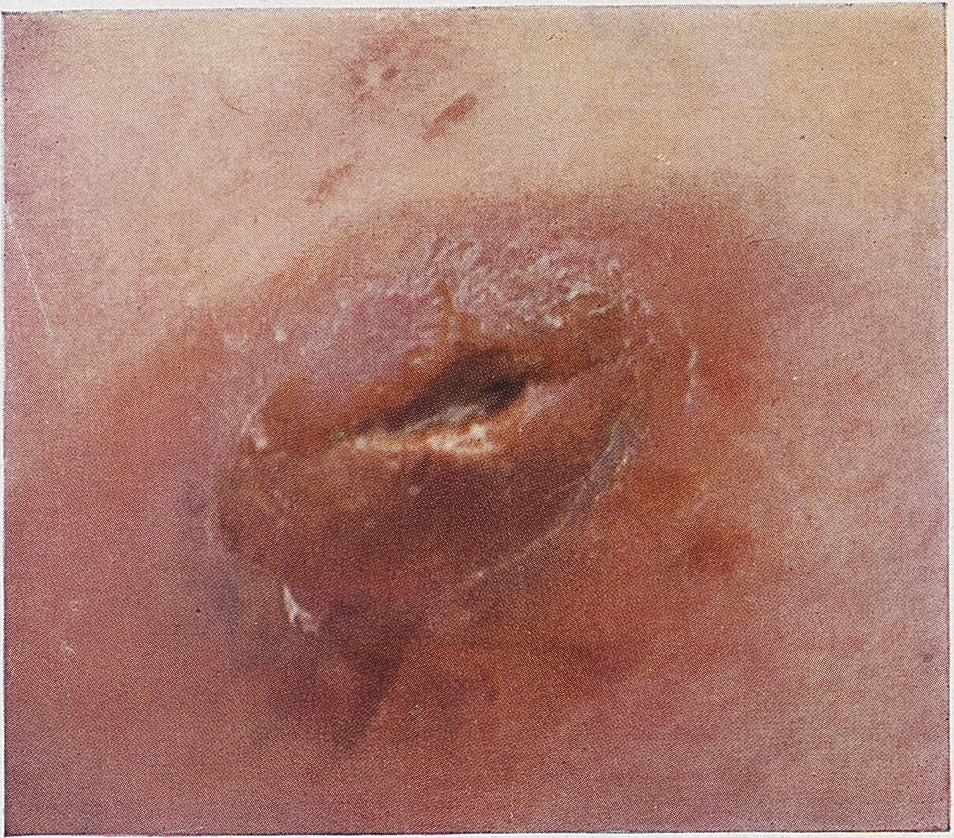
Close-up of boil showing sloughing and necrosis

Boils are bumpy, red, pus-filled lumps around a hair follicle that are tender, warm, and painful. They range from pea-sized to golf ball-sized. A yellow or white point at the center of the lump can be seen when the boil is ready to drain or discharge pus. In a severe infection, an individual may experience fever, swollen lymph nodes, and fatigue. A recurring boil is called chronic furunculosis. Skin infections tend to be recurrent in many patients and often spread to other family members. Systemic factors that lower resistance commonly are detectable, including: diabetes, obesity, and hematologic disorders.

Boils may appear on the buttocks or near the anus, the back, the neck, the belly, the chest, the arms or legs, or even in the ear canal. Boils may also appear around the eye, where they are called styes.

=== Complications ===
The most common complications of boils are scarring and infection or abscess of the skin, spinal cord, brain, kidneys, or other organs. Infections may also spread to the bloodstream (bacteremia) and become life-threatening. S. aureus strains first infect the skin and its structures (for example, sebaceous glands, hair follicles) or invade damaged skin (cuts, abrasions). Sometimes the infections are relatively limited (such as a stye, boil, furuncle, or carbuncle), but other times they may spread to other skin areas (causing cellulitis, folliculitis, or impetigo). Unfortunately, these bacteria can reach the bloodstream (bacteremia) and end up in many different body sites, causing infections (wound infections, abscesses, osteomyelitis, endocarditis, pneumonia) that may severely harm or kill the infected person. S. aureus strains also produce enzymes and exotoxins that likely cause or increase the severity of certain diseases. Such diseases include food poisoning, septic shock, toxic shock syndrome, and scalded skin syndrome.

== Causes ==
=== Bacteria ===
Naturally the cause is bacteria such as staphylococci that are present on the skin. Bacterial colonisation begins in the hair follicles and can cause local cellulitis and inflammation. Myiasis caused by the tumbu fly in Africa usually presents with cutaneous furuncles. Risk factors for furunculosis include bacterial carriage in the nostrils, diabetes mellitus, obesity, lymphoproliferative neoplasms, malnutrition, and use of immunosuppressive drugs.

=== Family history ===
People with recurrent boils are also more likely to have a positive family history, take antibiotics, and to have been hospitalised, anemic, or diabetic; they are also more likely to have associated skin diseases and multiple lesions.

=== Other ===
Other causes include poor immune system function such as from HIV/AIDS, diabetes, malnutrition, or alcoholism. Poor hygiene and obesity have also been linked. It may occur following antibiotic use due to the development of resistance to the antibiotics used. An associated skin disease favors recurrence. This may be attributed to the persistent colonization of abnormal skin with S. aureus strains, such as is the case in persons with atopic dermatitis. Boils that recur under the arm, breast or in the groin area may be associated with hidradenitis suppurativa (HS).

== Diagnosis ==
Diagnosis is made through clinical evaluation by a physician, which may include culturing of the lesion. Evaluation can further include imaging, such as an ultrasound, to evaluate for formation of an abscess or other complications.

== Treatment ==
A boil may clear up on its own without bursting, but more often it will need to be opened and drained. This will usually happen spontaneously within two weeks. Regular application of a warm moist compress, both before and after a boil opens, can help speed healing. The area must be kept clean, hands washed after touching it, and any dressings disposed of carefully, in order to avoid spreading the bacteria. A doctor may cut open or "lance" a boil to allow it to drain, but squeezing or cutting should not be attempted at home, as this may further spread the infection. Antibiotic therapy may be recommended for large or recurrent boils or those that occur in sensitive areas (such as the groin, breasts, armpits, around or in the nostrils, or in the ear). An antibiotic should not be used for longer than one month, with at least two months (preferably longer) between uses, otherwise it will lose its effectiveness.

Furuncles at risk of leading to serious complications should be incised and drained if antibiotics or steroid injections are not effective. These include furuncles that are unusually large, last longer than two weeks, or occur in the middle of the face or near the spine. Fever and chills are signs of sepsis and indicate immediate treatment.

Staphylococcus aureus has the ability to acquire antimicrobial resistance easily, making treatment difficult. Knowledge of the antimicrobial resistance of S. aureus is important in the selection of antimicrobials for treatment.

== See also ==
- Cutaneous condition
- Nodule (medicine)
