= BlephEx =

Powered eyelid-cleaning instrument

BlephEx is a handheld powered instrument used by eye-care professionals to clean the eyelid margins. The U.S. Food and Drug Administration (FDA) lists the generic type as a class I device (product code PYU) that is exempt from 510(k) premarket notification when used by a healthcare professional to cleanse the eyelid margins and eyelashes, subject to the limitations in 21 CFR 878.9. It is not approved or 510(k)-cleared by FDA as a treatment for blepharitis or dry eye disease.

== Device and classification ==
FDA's product-code definition for PYU is: "This device type is intended to cleanse the eyelid margins and eyelashes by a healthcare professional." The regulation cited is 21 CFR 878.4820 (surgical instrument motors and accessories/attachments), class I, not exempt from the quality-system regulation.

In July 2017 BlephEx, LLC submitted a request under section 513(g) of the Federal Food, Drug, and Cosmetic Act describing an "Eyelid Cleaning Product" as intended for eyelid cleaning and hygiene and "not for the cure, treatment or mitigation of any disease or condition," and stating that the product was not intended to be used as a treatment. FDA replied in September 2017 that, as so described, the product would fall within 21 CFR 878.4820, product code PYU, as a class I device exempt from 510(k), subject to 21 CFR 878.9. The 513(g) product was later marketed as the BlephEx Powered Eyelid Cleaning Sponge.

Class I 510(k) exemption is not FDA approval. Cosmetics are a separate FDA category; the 2017 correspondence treated the product as a medical device for professional eyelid hygiene, not as an approved cosmetic.

== Regulatory status ==
On 3 June 2026 FDA issued warning letter MARCS-CMS 725861 to BlephEx, LLC of Brentwood, Tennessee, addressed to owner and president James M. Rynerson, after an inspection from 30 October to 19 November 2025. FDA found that the firm had marketed the BlephEx Powered Eyelid Cleaning Sponge for treating symptoms of blepharitis and dry eye disease and for use in pre-cataract and pre-LASIK patients, uses that differed from the generic PYU classification. FDA stated that the product as described and marketed was adulterated under 21 U.S.C. § 351(f)(1)(B) because the firm lacked a premarket approval or investigational device exemption for those uses, and misbranded under 21 U.S.C. § 352(o) because it had been commercially distributed for a different intended use without a 510(k).

The same letter found that BlephEx, LLC had not submitted required device-identification information to FDA's Global Unique Device Identification Database (GUDID). It also cited current good manufacturing practice deficiencies, including complaint handling. The letter also addressed two other products from the firm, the OptiVize Ophthalmic Battery-Powered Electrolysis Unit and the OptiVize Ophthalmic Forceps. A warning letter is an advisory notice of FDA's position; it is not a court judgment.

== Clinical evidence ==
A 2024 prospective, randomised, double-masked, sham-controlled trial at the University of Freiburg, published in BMC Ophthalmology, assigned 42 patients with symptomatic blepharitis refractory to eyelid-margin care to BlephEx or a sham procedure; 20 patients in each arm were analysed after one dropout from each arm. The authors reported slightly greater changes in Ocular Surface Disease Index, Efron grading, and tear breakup time in the BlephEx arm than in the sham arm, but the differences were not statistically significant. They concluded: "No significant difference in outcomes was observed between patients who underwent BlephEx therapy and those who received sham treatment. BlephEx treatment cannot be recommended for treating blepharitis." The authors declared no competing interests.

A 2016 paper by Rynerson and Henry D. Perry in Clinical Ophthalmology proposed a "dry eye blepharitis syndrome" theory and discussed lid-margin biofilm. It is a narrative article by the inventor, not an independent randomised trial of BlephEx.

== History and claims ==
The device was developed by James M. Rynerson, an ophthalmologist and owner of BlephEx, LLC. In a 2022 book, Dry Eyes: The Cause, The Cure, Rynerson used the word "cure" on the cover. The front matter states: "These are my opinions which are not based on any randomized, double blind studies."

== Procedure ==
A clinician uses a handheld motor to spin a disposable microsponge along the eyelid margin. Manufacturer and trade publications describe an in-office procedure lasting several minutes and recommend repetition every several months.
