= Corneal neovascularization =

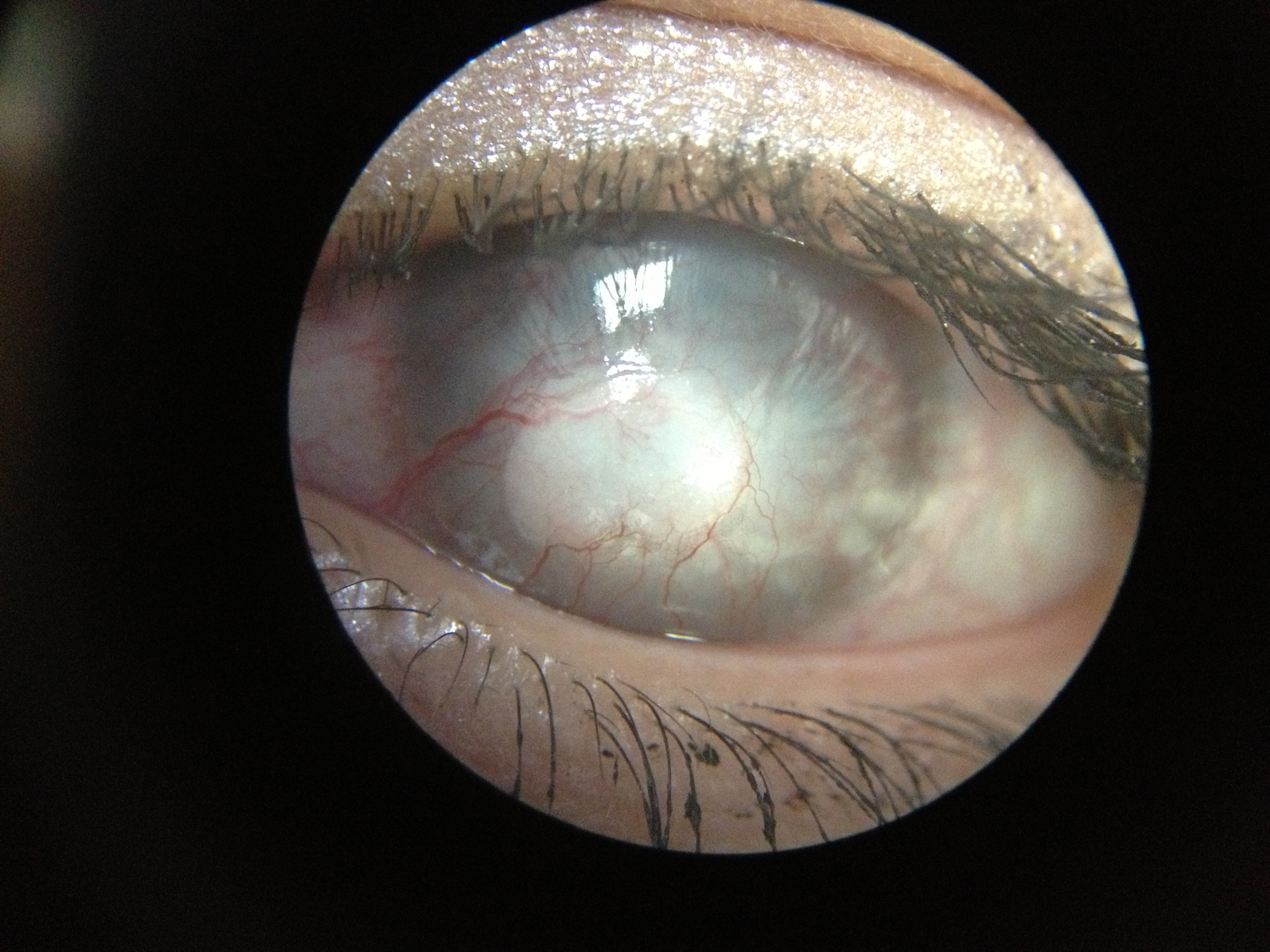
- Blood vessels in the cornea
- Specialty: Ophthalmology

Corneal neovascularization (CNV) is the in-growth of new blood vessels from the pericorneal plexus into avascular corneal tissue as a result of oxygen deprivation. Maintaining avascularity of the corneal stroma is an important aspect of healthy corneal physiology as it is required for corneal transparency and optimal vision. A decrease in corneal transparency causes visual acuity deterioration. Corneal tissue is avascular in nature and the presence of vascularization, which can be deep or superficial, is always pathologically related.

Corneal neovascularization is a sight-threatening condition that can be caused by inflammation related to infection, chemical injury, autoimmune conditions, immune hypersensitivity, post-corneal transplantation, and traumatic conditions among other ocular pathologies. Common causes of CNV within the cornea include trachoma, corneal ulcers, phlyctenular keratoconjunctivitis, rosacea keratitis, interstitial keratitis, sclerosing keratitis, chemical burns, and wearing contact lenses for over-extended periods of time. Superficial presentations of CNV are usually associated with contact lens wear, while deep presentations may be caused by chronic inflammatory and anterior segment ocular diseases.

Corneal neovascularization has become more common worldwide with an estimated incidence rate of 1.4 million cases per year, according to a 1998 study by the Massachusetts Eye and Ear Infirmary. The same study found that the tissue from twenty percent of corneas examined during corneal transplantations had some degree of neovascularization, negatively impacting the prognosis for individuals undergoing keratoplasty procedures.

== Presentation ==
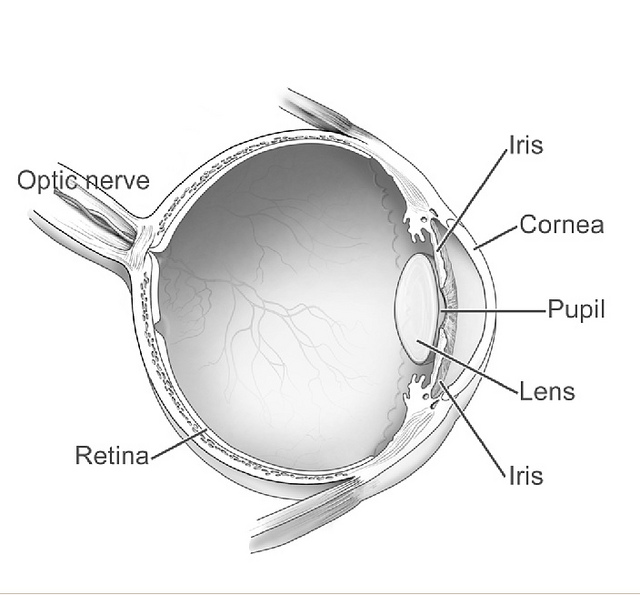
Diagram of the human eye

Cross-section of a normal cornea

=== Complications ===
In advanced stages, corneal neovascularization can threaten eyesight, which is why routine (annual) eye exams are recommended for contact lens patients.

== Causes ==
CNV causes may be congenital in nature—such as with aniridia—or acquired. Frequently, inflammatory, infectious, degenerative, traumatic, or iatrogenic (e.g., contact lenses) conditions can be responsible for acquired CNV.

Some major acquired inflammatory conditions include graft rejection following keratoplasty, graft or host diseases of the new tissue, atopic conjunctivitis, rosacea, ocular pemphigoid, Lyell's syndrome, and Stevens–Johnson syndrome.

Infections responsible for CNV range from the bacterial (chlamydia, syphilis, pseudomonas) and viral (e.g., herpes simplex & herpes zoster viruses) to the fungal (candida, aspergillus, fusarium) and parasitic (onchocerca volvolus).

Degenerative diseases such as pterygiums and Terrien's marginal degeneration may also be responsible.

Traumatic causes of CNV include ulceration, alkali burns, and stem cell deficiency.

One of the most common causes of corneal neovascularization is iatrogenic pathology from extended contact lens wear. This is especially likely with lenses made with older hydrogel materials such as HEMA (2-hydroxyethyl methacrylate) for both daily and extended wear. Such older hydrogel materials have a relatively low oxygen transmissibility so the cornea becomes starved of oxygen; this leads to the ingress of blood capillaries into the clear cornea, in an attempt to provide more oxygen to the affected area. Older estimates cite 128,000 to 470,000 cases of lens-induced CNV each year, but this may be decreasing due to the increasing popularity of daily disposable lenses.

The risk for CNV is elevated in certain instances for patients following penetrating keratoplasty without active inflammation or epithelial defects. For example, the condition is more likely to occur in those with active blepharitis, those who receive sutured knots in their host stromas, and those with a large recipient area.

== Pathogenesis ==
The in-growth of new blood vessels is mediated by the upregulation of angiogenic cytokines. The enzyme metalloproteinase degrades the cornea's basement membrane and extracellular matrix, while proteolytic enzymes allow vascular epithelial cells to enter the stromal layer of the cornea.

When ocular inflammation occurs, corneal epithelial and endothelial cells, macrophages and certain inflammatory cells produce angiogenic growth factors, namely vascular endothelial growth factor (VEGF) and fibroblast growth factors. VEGF paves the way for new blood vessel formation by upregulating matrix metalloproteinases production by endothelial cells in the limbal vascular plexus.

== Treatment ==
Treatments for corneal neovascularization are predominately off-lab with a multitude of complications as a result. The desired results from medical therapy may not always occur, ergo an invasive procedure may be needed to prevent further decrease in corneal avascularity.

For contact lenses related hypoxia, ceasing the use of contact lenses is the first step until corneal neovascularization is addressed by a physician. Modern rigid gas permeable and silicone hydrogel contact lenses have a much higher level of oxygen transmissibility, making them effective alternatives to help prevent corneal neovascularization.

Topical administration of steroids and non-steroid anti-inflammatory drugs are first-line treatment for individuals with CNV. The administration of steroids can increase the risk of infection, glaucoma, cataracts, herpes simplex recurrence. The anti-inflammatory drugs, however, increase the risk of corneal ulceration and melting.

Since VEGF plays an important role in vasculogenesis and pathologic neovascularization associated with eye diseases, a potential treatment for CNV is to inhibit VEGF activity by competing the binding of VEGF with specific neutralizing anti-VEGF antibody. VEGF inhibitors include pegaptanib sodium, ranibizumab, and off-label bevacizumab are currently used for treatment of various retinal disease. Anti-VEGF antibodies such as the application of ranibizumab or bevacizumab have been shown to reduce corneal neovascularization. Both ranibizumab and bevacizumab uses the same mechanism and inhibits all iso-forms of VEGF. The significant reduction in invasion of in-growth blood vessels in terms of neovascular area and vessel caliber suggests that treatment with ranibizumab induces thinning of the blood vessels, however, there's no significant change of the blood vessel's length. Using anti-VEGF antibodies to treat CNV has some limitations such as it is not a cure and may require repeated treatments to maintain positive effects over time. Topical and/or subconjunctival administration of bevacizumab or ranibizumab have demonstrated short-term safety and efficacy, however long term effects have not been documented. Anti-VEGF therapy is currently an experimental treatment.

If the cornea is inflamed via corneal neovascularization, the suppression of enzymes can block CNV by compromising with corneal structural integrity. Corneal neovascularization can be suppressed with a combination of orally administration of doxycycline and with topical corticosteroid.

=== Surgical options ===
Invasive solutions for corneal neovascularization are reserved when the medical therapies do not provide the desired results.

Invading blood tissues and ablating tissues in the cornea can be obstructed by the use of laser treatments such as Argon and Nd:YAG lasers. Irradiation and/or damages to adjacent tissues caused by the procedure can result in corneal hemorrhage and corneal thinning. Obstruction of the blood vessels can be unsuccessful due to the depth, size, and, high blood flow rate of the vessels. In conjunction, thermal damage from the lasers can trigger inflammatory response which can exaggerate the neovascularization.

An effective treatment is photodynamic therapy, however, this treatment has limited clinical acceptance due to high costs and many potential complications involved that are also related to laser ablation. Complications can include irradiation from previously injected photosensitive dye inducing apoptosis and necrosis of the endothelium and basement membrane.

Diathermy and cautery is a treatment where an electrolysis needle is inserted into the feeder vessels in the limbus. The vessels are obstructed by a coagulating current through the use of unipolar diathermy unit or by thermal cautery.

== Research ==
Reduction of neovascularization has been achieved in rats by the topical instillation of commercially available triamcinolone and doxycycline.

Some evidence exists to suggest that the Angiotensin II receptor blocker drug telmisartan will prevent corneal neovascularization.

Recent treatment developments include topical application of bevacizumab, an anti-VEGF.
