= Pericorneal plexus =

Blood vessels in the eye

The pericorneal plexus refers to a network of blood vessels in the eye; specifically to branches of the anterior conjunctival arteries. These vessels are arranged around the cornea in superficial and deep layers.

== See also ==
- Corneal neovascularization - related disease - growth of blood vessels from the pericorneal plexus into the cornea
