= Eduard Zeis =

German surgeon and ophthalmologist

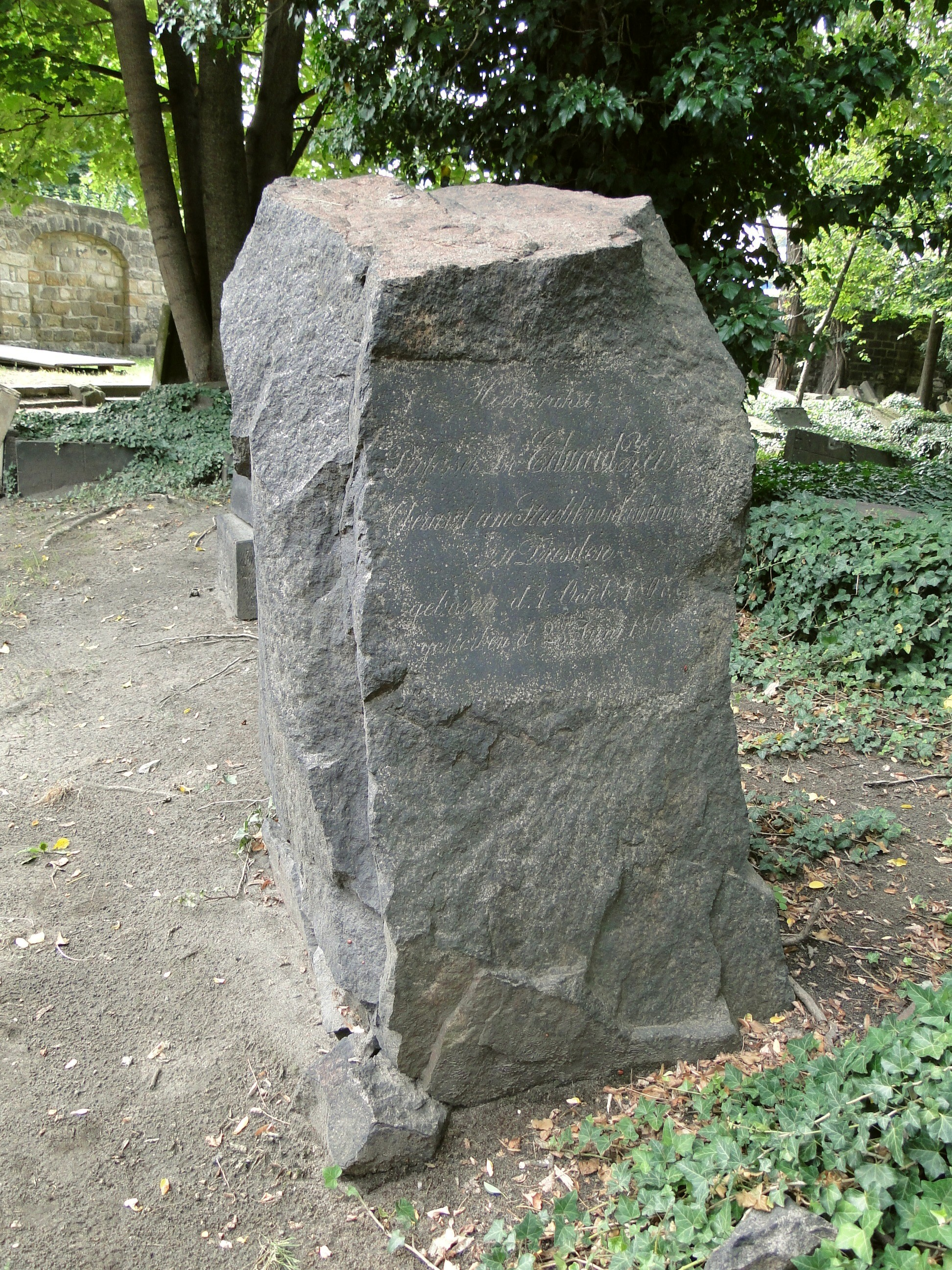
Grave of Eduard Zeis at Eliasfriedhof in Dresden.

Eduard Zeis (1 October 1807 – 28 June 1868) was a German surgeon and ophthalmologist born in Dresden.

He studied medicine at Leipzig University, the University of Bonn, and the Ludwig-Maximilians-Universität München, receiving his doctorate at Leipzig University in 1832. Afterwards, he opened a general practice in his hometown of Dresden, later becoming a professor of surgery at Marburg University (1844). In 1850, he returned to Dresden and was senior medical officer at the newly founded city hospital in Dresden-Friedrichstadt.

In 1838, he published the first textbook of plastic surgery, "Handbuch der plastischen Chirurgie", of which he established the term "plastische chirurgie" (plastic surgery). Its foreword was written by famed surgeon Johann Friedrich Dieffenbach (1792–1847), and the textbook has since been translated into English. In 1838, Zeis published a study involving dreams of the blind.

His name is associated with the eponymous "glands of Zeis", described as sebaceous glands that open into the follicles of the eyelashes, as well as to "Zeisian sty", which is an inflammation of one of Zeis' glands.

== Selected works ==
- Handbuch der plastischen Chirurgie, 1838.
- Abhandlungen aus dem Gebiete der Chirurgie, 1845.
- Beiträge zur pathologischen Anatomie und zur Pathologie des Hüftgelenkes, 1851.
- Die Literatur und Geschichte der plastischen Chirurgie, 1863.
- Nachträge zur Literatur und Geschichte der plastischen Chirurgie, 1864.
- "The Zeis Index and History of Plastic Surgery, 900 B.C.-1863 A.D."; Williams and Wilkins, 1977 - 315 pages.
- "Zeis' Manual of Plastic Surgery"; Oxford University Press, 1988 - 225 pages.
