= Tobramycin/dexamethasone =

Pharmaceutical preparation

Combination of
- Tobramycin: Aminoglycoside antibiotic
- Dexamethasone: Glucocorticoid

Clinical data
- Trade names: Tobradex
- AHFS/Drugs.com: Professional Drug Facts
- Routes of administration: Eye drops, topical
- ATC code: S01CA01 (WHO)

Legal status
- Legal status: US: ℞-only

Identifiers
- CAS Number: 32986-56-4; 50-02-2
- DrugBank: DB00684
- ChemSpider: 10123949
- UNII: VZ8RRZ51VK; 7S5I7G3JQL
- KEGG: D11178
- ChEBI: CHEBI:28864
- ChEMBL: ChEMBL1747
- CompTox Dashboard (EPA): DTXSID50183039

Tobramycin/dexamethasone, sold under the brand name Tobradex, is a fixed-dose combination medication in the form of eye drops and eye ointment, marketed by Alcon. The active ingredients are tobramycin (an antibiotic) and dexamethasone (a corticosteroid). It is prescribed for the treatment of pink eye in combination with bacterial infections.

== Contraindications ==
It is contraindicated with herpetic and other viral eye infections. Other contraindications include fungal and mycobacterial infections because tobramycin is inactive against those, and the corticoid acts as an immunosuppressive agent, preventing the body's immune system from dealing with the infection. The drops are also contraindicated in patients with corneal lesions.

== Side effects ==
Similarly to other corticosteroid eye drops, side effects include hypersensitivity and, especially after long-term use, secondary eye infections, cataract (clouding of the eye lens) and increased intraocular pressure, leading to glaucoma. Consequently, the drug should not be applied longer than 24 days without further medical evaluation.

== Interactions ==
Anticholinergic eye drops potentiate the risk of increased intraocular pressure. Systemic aminoglycoside antibiotics increase toxicity for ears, nerves and kidney.

== Brand names ==
Tobrason is a brand name in Jordan.
