= Gland of Zeis =

Sebaceous glands on the margin of the eyelid

Glands of Zeis are unilobar sebaceous glands located on the margin of the eyelid. The glands of Zeis service the eyelash. These glands produce an oily substance that is issued through the excretory ducts of the sebaceous lobule into the middle portion of the hair follicle. In the same area of the eyelid, near the base of the eyelashes are apocrine glands called the "glands of Moll".

If eyelashes are not kept clean, conditions such as folliculitis may take place, and if the sebaceous gland becomes infected, it can lead to abscesses and styes. The glands of Zeis are named after German ophthalmologist Eduard Zeis (1807–68).

== See also ==
- List of specialized glands within the human integumentary system
- Meibomian gland
- Moll's gland
