= Meibomian gland =

Sebaceous glands along the rims of the eyelid

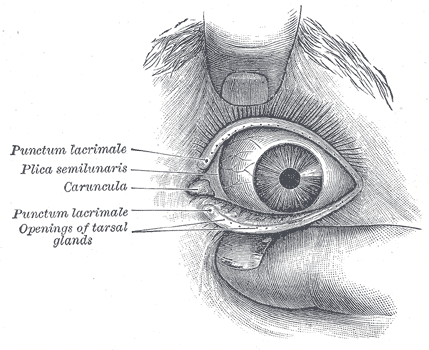
- Front of left eye with eyelids separated to show medial canthus and openings of meibomian (tarsal) glands

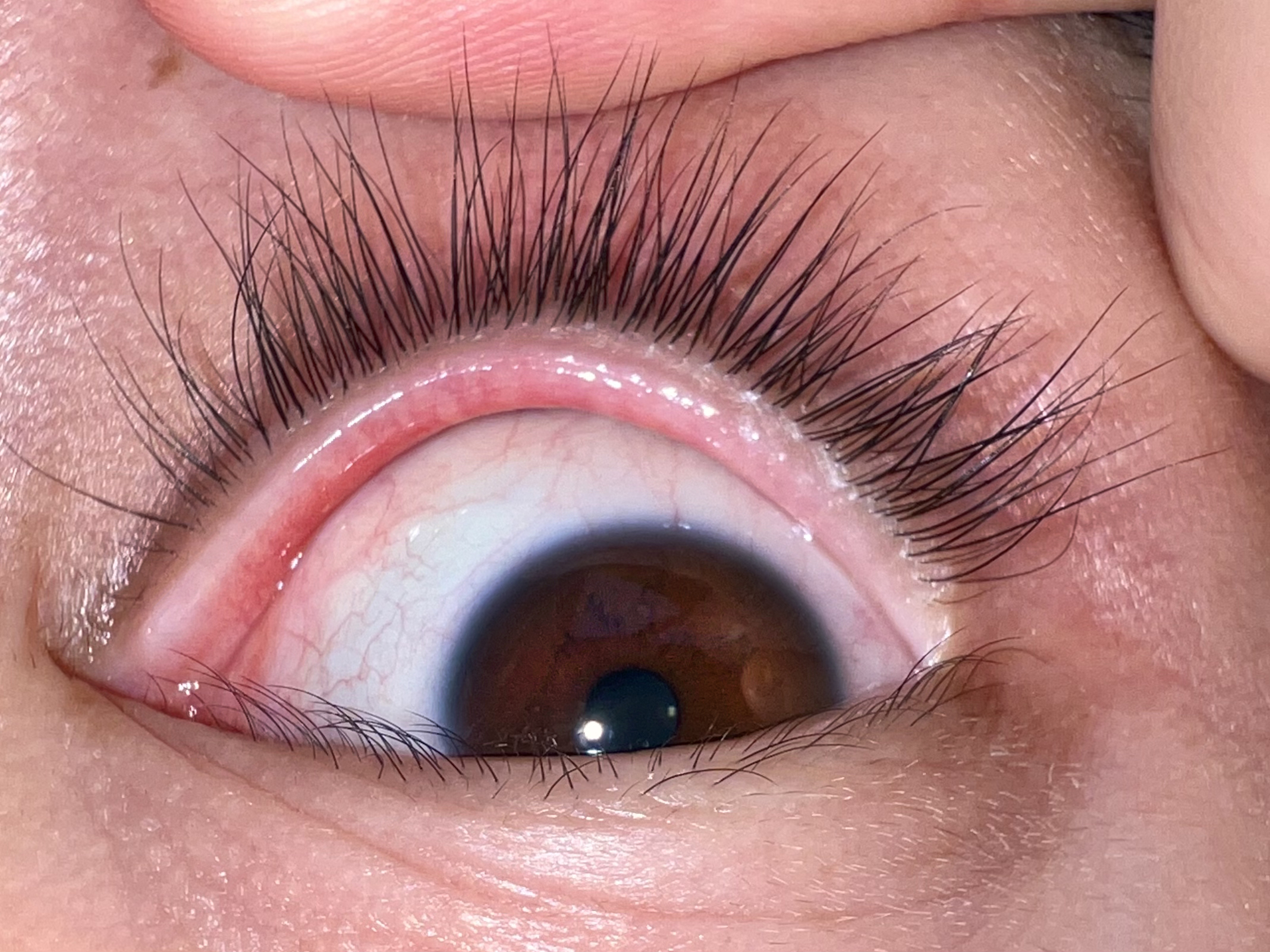
- Openings of the meibomian glands visible below the eyelashes of the upper eyelid

Details
- System: Integumentary

Identifiers
- Latin: glandula tarsalis
- MeSH: D008537
- TA98: A15.2.07.042
- TA2: 6833
- FMA: 59104 71872, 59104

Meibomian (/mī-ˈbō-mē-ən/) glands (also called tarsal glands, palpebral glands, and tarsoconjunctival glands) are sebaceous glands along the rims of the eyelid inside the tarsal plate. They produce meibum, an oily substance that prevents evaporation of the eye's tear film. Meibum prevents tears from spilling onto the cheek, traps them between the oiled edge and the eyeball, and makes the closed lids airtight. There are about 25 such glands on the upper eyelid, and 20 on the lower eyelid.

Dysfunctional meibomian glands is believed to be the most common cause of dry eyes. They are also the cause of posterior blepharitis.

== History ==
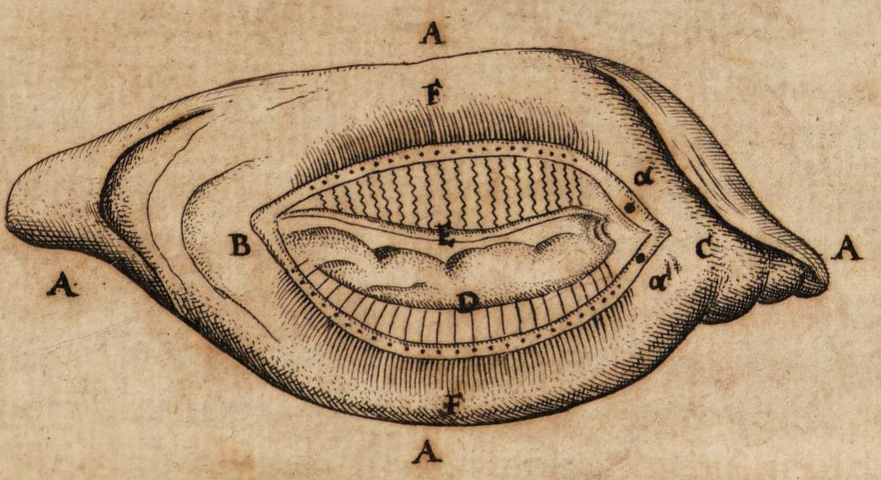
First drawing of the meibomian gland by Heinrich Meibom. Year 1666.

The glands were mentioned by Galen in 200 AD and were described in more detail by Heinrich Meibom (1638–1700), a German physician, in his work De Vasis Palpebrarum Novis Epistola in 1666. This work included a drawing with the basic characteristics of the glands.

== Anatomy ==
Although the upper lid has a greater number and volume of meibomian glands than the lower lid, there is no consensus whether it contributes more to the tear film stability. The glands do not have direct contact with eyelash follicles. The process of blinking releases meibum into the lid margin.

== Function ==
=== Meibum ===
==== Lipids ====
Lipids are the major components of meibum (also known as "meibomian gland secretions"). The term "meibum" was originally introduced by Nicolaides et al. in 1981.

The biochemical composition of meibum is extremely complex and very different from that of sebum. Lipids are universally recognized as major components of human and animal meibum. An update was published in 2009 on the composition of human meibum and on the structures of various positively identified meibomian lipids.

Currently, the most sensitive and informative approach to lipidomic analysis of meibum is mass spectrometry, either with direct infusion or in combination with liquid chromatography.

The lipids are the main component of the lipid layer of the tear film, preventing rapid evaporation and it is believed they lower the surface tension which helps to stabilize the tear film.

==== Proteins ====
In humans, more than 90 different proteins have been identified in meibomian gland secretions.

== Clinical significance ==
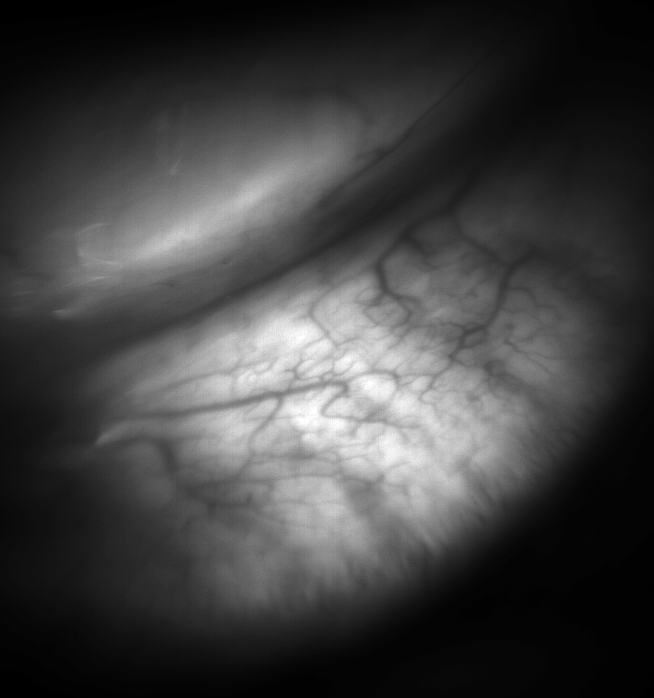
Meibomian glands in the lower eyelid imaged under amber light to show vasculature support and the gland structure

Dysfunctional meibomian glands often cause dry eyes, one of the more common eye conditions. They may also contribute to blepharitis. Inflammation of the meibomian glands (also known as meibomitis, meibomian gland dysfunction, or posterior blepharitis) causes the glands to be obstructed by thick, cloudy-to-yellow, more opaque and viscous-like, oily and waxy secretions, a change from the glands' normal clear secretions. Besides leading to dry eyes, the obstructions can be degraded by bacterial lipases, resulting in the formation of free fatty acids, which irritate the eyes and sometimes cause punctate keratopathy.

Meibomian gland dysfunction is more often seen in women and is regarded as the main cause of dry eye disease. Factors that contribute to meibomian gland dysfunction can include things such as a person's age and/or hormones, or severe infestation of Demodex brevis mite.

Treatment can include warm compresses to thin the secretions and eyelid scrubs with a commercial eyelid cleanser or baby shampoo, or emptying ("expression") of the gland by a professional. Lifitegrast and ciclosporin are topical medication commonly used to control the inflammation and improve the oil quality. In some cases, topical steroids and topical (drops or ointment)/oral antibiotics (to reduce bacteria on the lid margin) are also prescribed to reduce inflammation. Intense pulsed light (IPL) treatments have also been shown to reduce inflammation and improve gland function. Meibomian gland probing is also used on patients who experience deep clogging of the glands.

Meibomian gland dysfunction may be caused by some prescription medications, notably isotretinoin. A blocked meibomian gland can cause a chalazion (or "meibomian cyst") to form in the eyelid.

== See also ==
- Gland of Zeis
- List of specialized glands within the human integumentary system
- Meibomian gland dysfunction
- Moll's gland
