= Blepharitis =

Inflammation of the eyelid

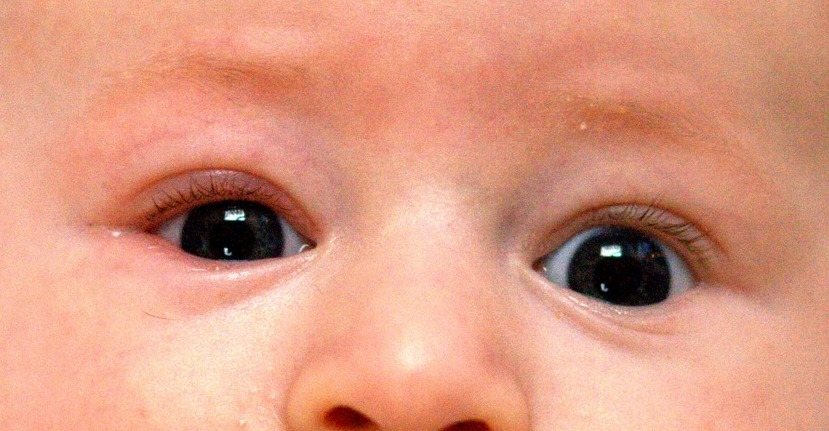
- An infant with mild blepharitis on his right side
- Pronunciation: /blɛfəˈraɪtɪs/ BLEF-ər-EYE-tis
- Specialty: Ophthalmology, Optometry
- Symptoms: crusty eyelids

Blepharitis is inflammation of the eyelid, known also as granulated eyelids. It's a common ocular pathology characterized by inflammation, scaling, reddening, and crusting of the eyelid. This condition may also cause swelling, burning, itching, or a grainy sensation when introducing foreign objects or substances to the eye. Although blepharitis by itself is not sight-threatening, it can lead to permanent alterations of the eyelid margin. The primary cause is bacteria and inflammation from congested meibomian oil glands at the base of each eyelash. Other conditions may give rise to blepharitis, whether they be infectious or noninfectious, including, but not limited to, bacterial infections or allergies.

Different variations of blepharitis can be classified as seborrheic, staphylococcal, mixed, posterior or meibomitis, or parasitic. In a survey of US ophthalmologists and optometrists, 37% to 47% of patients seen by those surveyed had signs of blepharitis, which can affect all ages and ethnic groups. One single-center study of 90 patients with chronic blepharitis found that the average age of patients was 50 years old. The word is from Greek βλέφαρον (blepharon) 'eyelid' and –itis 'inflammation of'.

== Signs and symptoms ==
Blepharitis is characterized by chronic inflammation of the eyelid, usually at the base of the eyelashes. Symptoms include inflammation, irritation, itchiness, a burning sensation, excessive tearing, and crusting and sticking of eyelids. Additional symptoms may include visual impairment such as photophobia and blurred vision. Symptoms are generally worse in the mornings and patients may experience exacerbation and several remissions if left untreated. It is typically caused by bacterial infection or blockage of the meibomian oil glands. Diseases and conditions that may lead to blepharitis include rosacea, herpes simplex dermatitis, varicella-zoster dermatitis, molluscum contagiosum, allergic dermatitis, contact dermatitis, seborrheic dermatitis, staphylococcal dermatitis, demodicosis and phthiriasis palpebrarum.

The parasite Demodex folliculorum (D. folliculorum) causes blepharitis when the parasite is present in excessive numbers within the dermis of the eyelids. These parasites can live for approximately 15 days. The parasites (both adult and eggs) live on the hair follicle, inhabiting the sebaceous and apocrine gland of the human lid. Direct contact allows this pathogen to spread. Factors that allow this pathogen to multiply include hypervascular tissue, poor hygienic conditions, and immune deficiency. In treating blepharitis caused by D. folliculorum, mechanical cleaning and proper hygiene are important towards decreasing the parasite's numbers.

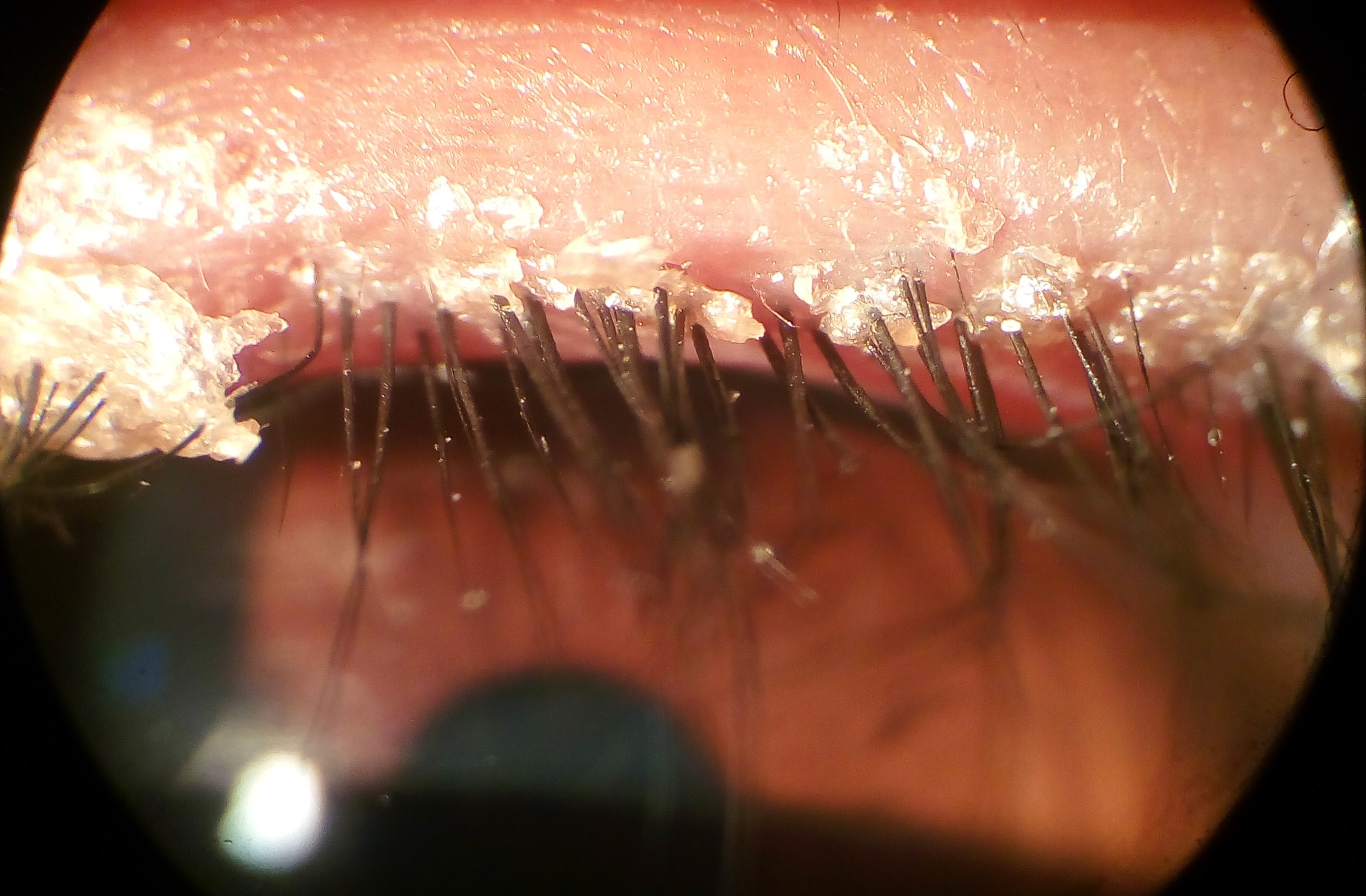
Scaling and bacterial debris at the base of the eyelashes

=== Associated symptoms ===
- Watery eyes – due to excessive tearing.
- Red eyes – due to dilated blood vessels on the sclera.
- Swollen eyelids – due to inflammation.
- Crusting at the eyelid margins/base of the eyelashes/medial canthus, generally worse on waking – due to excessive bacterial buildup along the lid margins.
- Eyelid sticking – due to crusting along the eyelid margin.
- Eyelid itching – due to the irritation from inflammation and epidermis scaling of the eyelid.
- Flaking of skin on eyelids – due to tear film suppressed by clogged meibomian glands.
- Gritty/burning sensation in the eye, or foreign-body sensation – due to crusting from bacteria and clogged oil glands
- Frequent blinking – due to impaired tear film from clogged oil glands unable to keep tears from evaporating.
- Light sensitivity/photophobia
- Misdirected eyelashes that grow abnormally – due to permanent damage to the eyelid margin
- Eyelash loss – due to excessive buildup of bacteria along the base of the eyelashes.
- Infection of the eyelash follicle/sebaceous gland (hordeolum)
- Debris in the tear film, seen under magnification (improved contrast with use of fluorescein drops)

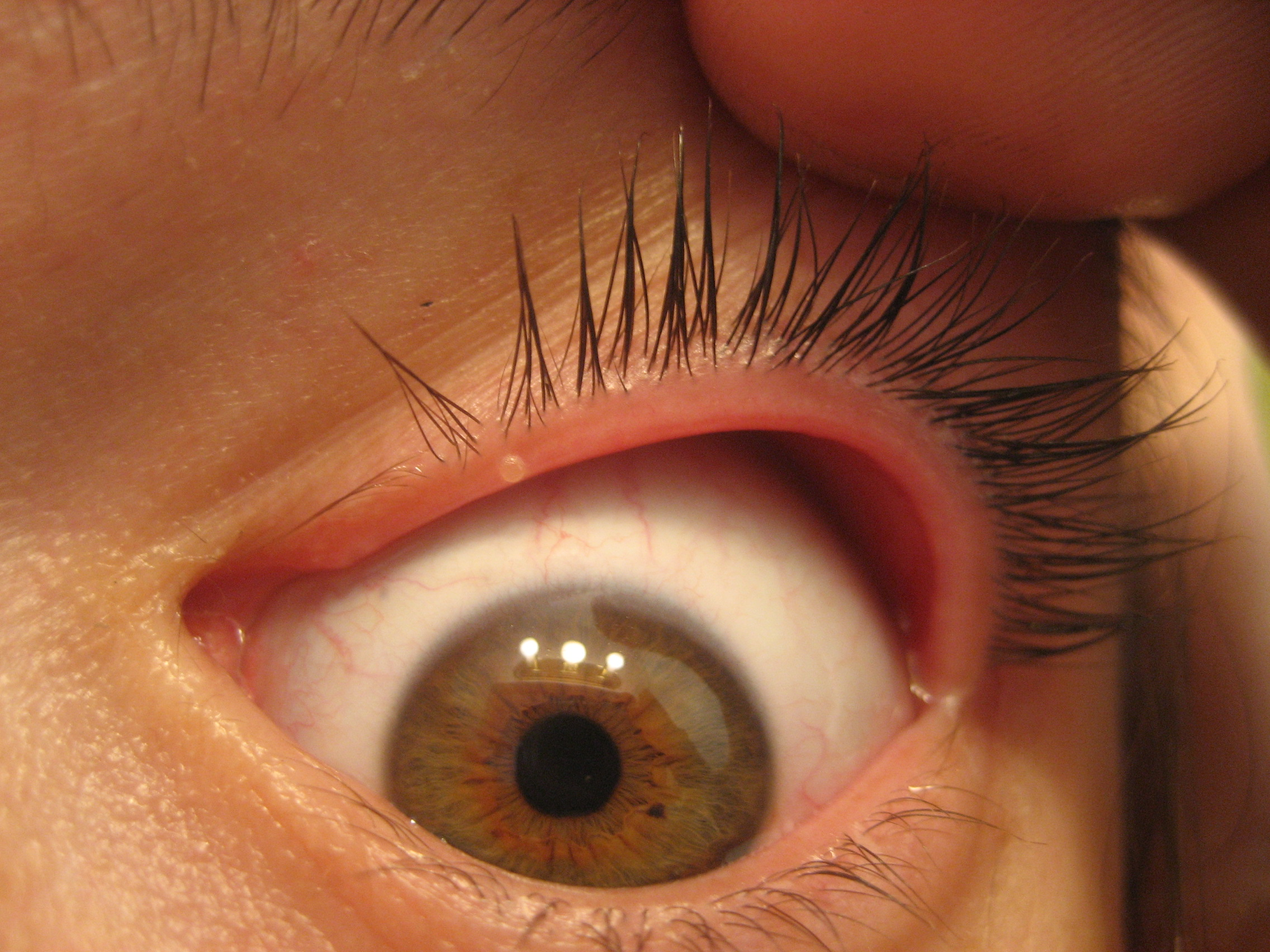
Chalazion

Chronic blepharitis may result in damage of varying severity and, in the worst cases, may have a negative effect on vision. This can be resolved with a proper eyeglass prescription. Long-term untreated blepharitis can lead to eyelid scarring, excess tearing, difficulty wearing contact lenses, development of a stye (an infection near the base of the eyelashes, resulting in a painful lump on the edge of the eyelid) or a chalazion (a blockage/bacteria infection in a small oil gland at the margin of the eyelid, just behind the eyelashes, leading to a red, swollen eyelid), chronic pink eye (conjunctivitis), keratitis, and corneal ulcer or irritation. The lids may become red and may have ulcerate, non-healing areas that may lead to bleeding. Blepharitis can also cause blurred vision due to a poor tear film. Tears may be frothy or bubbly, which can contribute to mild scarring along the eyelids. Symptoms and signs of blepharitis are often erroneously ascribed by the patient to "recurrent conjunctivitis".

=== Subtype symptoms ===
General symptoms include a foreign body sensation, matting of the lashes, and burning. Collarette around eyelashes, a ring-like formation around the lash shaft, can be observed. Other symptoms include loss of eyelashes or broken eyelashes. The condition can sometimes lead to a chalazion or a stye. Chronic bacterial blepharitis may also lead to ectropion. Posterior blepharitis or rosacea-associated blepharitis is manifested by a broad spectrum of symptoms involving the lids including inflammation and plugging of the meibomian orifices and production of abnormal secretion upon pressure over the glands.

== Mechanism ==
The mechanism by which the bacteria causes symptoms of blepharitis is not fully understood and may include direct irritation of bacterial toxins and/or enhanced cell-mediated immunity to S. aureus.

Staphylococcal blepharitis is caused by an infection of the anterior portion of the eyelid by staphylococcal bacteria. In a study of ocular flora, 46% to 51% of those diagnosed with staphylococcal blepharitis had cultures positive for Staphylococcus aureus in comparison to 8% of normal patients. Staphylococcal blepharitis may start in childhood and continue into adulthood. It is commonly recurrent and it requires special medical care. The prevalence of S. aureus in the conjunctival sac and on the lid margin varies among countries, likely due to differences in climate and environment. Seborrheic blepharitis is characterized by less inflammation than Staphylococcal blepharitis; however, it causes more excess oil or greasy scaling. Meibomian gland dysfunction is a result of abnormalities of the meibomian glands and altered secretion of meibum, which plays an imperative role in lagging the evaporation of tear films and smoothing of the tear film to produce an even optical surface. Posterior blepharitis is an inflammation of the eyelids, secondary to dysfunction of the meibomian glands. Like anterior blepharitis, it is a bilateral chronic condition and may be associated with skin rosacea. There is growing evidence that, in some cases, it is caused by demodex mites.

== Diagnosis ==
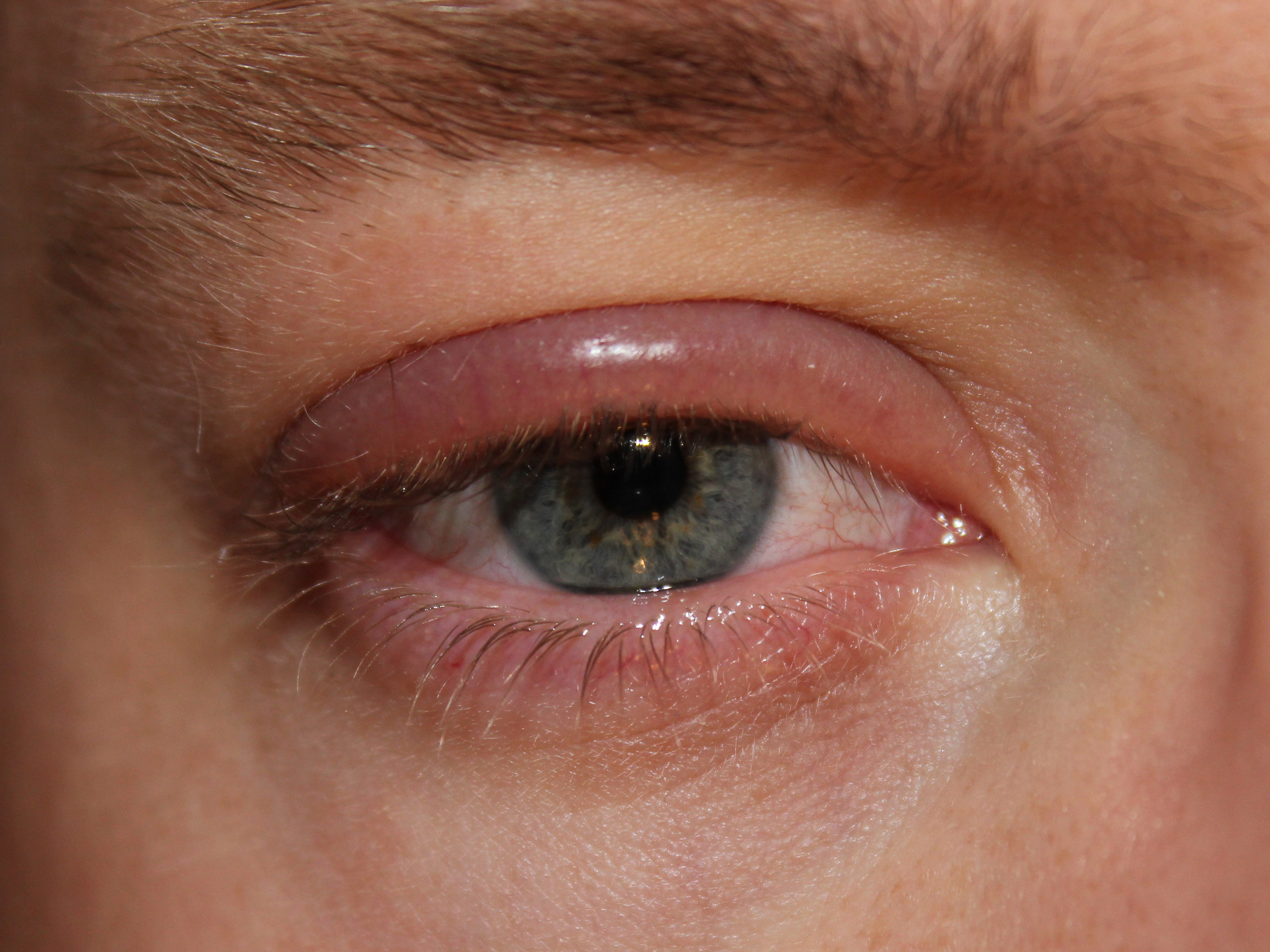
Blepharitis: swollen and reddened eyelid

Diagnosis of the condition is done via a physical examination under a slit lamp. Cultures of debris are occasionally collected for bacterial or fungal testing.

=== Examination ===
In all forms of blepharitis, optometrists or ophthalmologists examine the tear film, which is the most efficient method in determining instability. The most frequently used method is to measure tear production via tear break-up time (TBUT), which calculates the duration interval between complete blinks. This serves as a primary indication of regional dryness in the pre-corneal tear film after fluorescein injections. If TBUT is shorter than 10 seconds, then this suggests instability.

Staphylococcal blepharitis is diagnosed by examining erythema and edema of the eyelid margin. Patients may exhibit alopecia areata of eyelashes and/or growth misdirection, trichiasis. Other signs may include telangiectasia on the anterior eyelid, collarettes encircling the lash base, and corneal changes. Seborrheic blepharitis is distinguished by less erythema, edema, and telangiectasia of the eyelid margins. Posterior blepharitis and Meibomian gland dysfunction are frequently associated with rosacea and can be seen during an ocular examination of the posterior eyelid margin. The Meibomian glands may appear caked with oil or visibly obstructed.

=== Procedures ===
Cultures of the eyelid margins can be a clear indicator for patients who have recurrent anterior blepharitis with severe inflammation, in addition to patients who are not responding to therapy. Measurements of tear osmolarity may be beneficial in diagnosing concurrent dry eye syndrome (DES), which may be responsible for overlapping symptoms and would allow the physician to decipher between conditions and move forward with the most beneficial protocol for the patient. Consequently, the measurement of tear osmolarity has various limitations in differentiating between aqueous deficiencies and evaporative dry eye. Microscopic evaluation of epilated eyelashes may reveal mites, which have been evident in cases of chronic blepharoconjunctivitis. A biopsy of the eyelid can also determine the exclusion of carcinoma, therapy resistance, or unifocal recurrent chalazia.

=== Related conditions ===
Condition	Entity
Bacterial infections	Erysipelas (due to Streptococcus pyogenes) Impetigo (due to Staphylococcus aureus)
Viral infections	Herpes simplex virus Molluscum contagiosum Varicella zoster virus Papillomavirus Vaccinia
Parasitic infection	Pediculosis palperbrarum
Immunologic conditions	Atopic dermatitis Contact dermatitis Erythema multiforme Crohn's disease
Dermatoses	Psoriasis Erythroderma
Benign eyelid tumors	Actinic keratosis Pyogenic granuloma
Malignant eyelid tumors	Melanoma Mycosis fungoides Basal cell carcinoma
Trauma	Chemical Radiation Surgical Thermal
Toxic conditions	Medicamentosa

== Prevention ==
Blepharitis is a result of bacteria and inflammation from congested meibomian oil glands at the base of each eyelash. Routine washing of the eyelids helps subdue symptoms and prevent blepharitis. Washing each eyelid for 30 seconds, twice a day, with a single drop of hypoallergenic soap (e.g. baby shampoo) and ample water can help. The most effective treatment is over the counter lid scrubs used twice a day. Some doctors may recommend using a hypochlorous acid treatment depending on the severity.

== Treatment ==
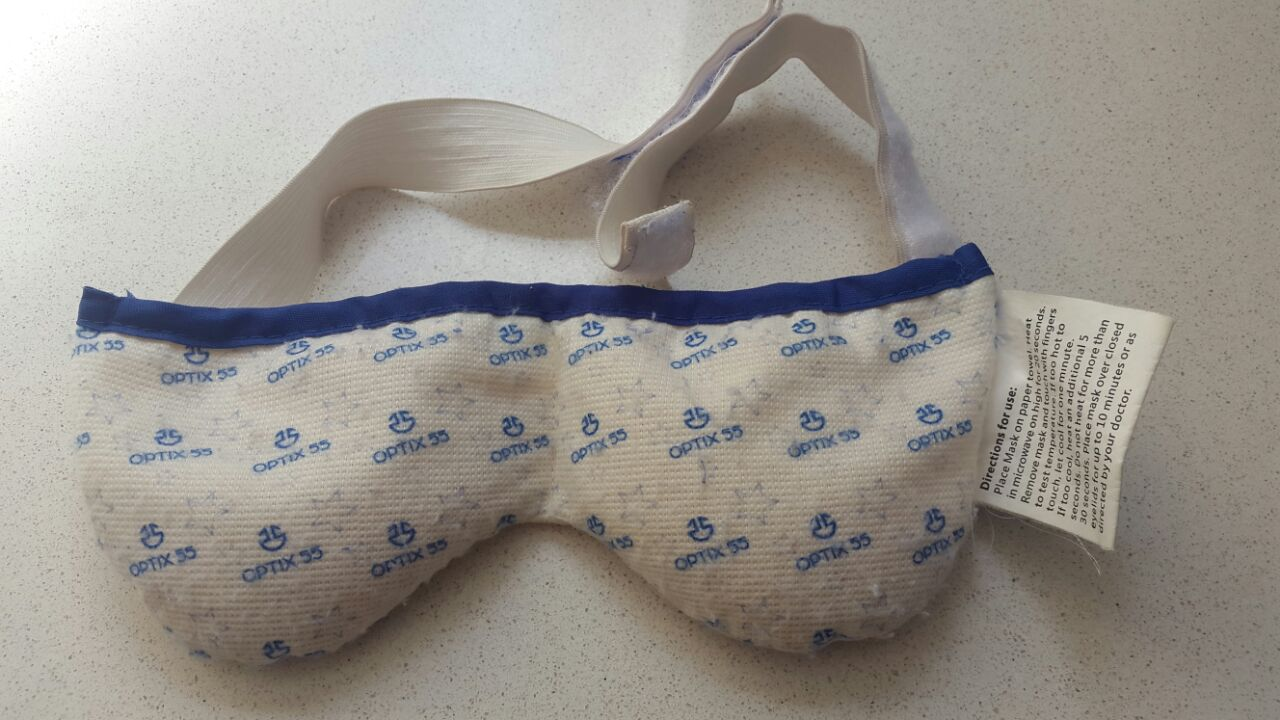
Microwavable warm compresses for daily loop treatment

Blepharitis is a chronic condition causing frequent exacerbation, thus requiring routine eyelid hygiene. Hygienic practices include warm compresses, eyelid massages, and eyelid scrubs. A Cochrane Systematic Review found topical antibiotics to be effective in providing symptomatic relief and clearing bacteria for individuals with anterior blepharitis. Topical steroids provided some symptomatic relief, but they were ineffective in clearing bacteria from the eyelids. Eyelid hygiene measures such as warm compresses and eyelid scrubs were found to be effective in providing symptomatic relief for participants with anterior and posterior blepharitis. BlephEx is a handheld medical device used by a doctor to exfoliate eyelids to treat blepharitis.

Lotilaner (Xdemvy) was approved for medical use in the United States in July 2023, for the treatment of Demodex blepharitis.

== Prognosis ==
Blepharitis is a chronic condition that has periods of exacerbation and remission. Patients should be informed that symptoms can frequently improve but are rarely eliminated. Infrequently, severe blepharitis can result in permanent alterations in the eyelid margin or vision loss from superficial keratopathy, corneal neovascularization, and ulceration. Patients with an inflammatory eyelid lesion that appears suspicious of malignancy should be referred to an appropriate specialist.

== Research ==
A study conducted in November 2017 detected a correlation between blepharitis and early-onset metabolic syndrome (MetS). To investigate the relationship between blepharitis and MetS, researchers used the Longitudinal Health Insurance Database in Taiwan. Results indicated that hyperlipidaemia and coronary artery disease were significantly correlated with the prior development of blepharitis. Therefore, blepharitis was shown to be significantly related to MetS and can serve as an early indication of the condition.

In another study, the presence of Demodex mites was shown to be a common cause of blepharitis. However, the pathogenesis of demodicosis is still unclear. In this study, researchers provided a diagnosis of the disease and proposed diagnostic criteria for Demodex blepharitis.

There is inadequate evidence to draw conclusions about the use of oral doxycycline in the treatment of blepharitis. According to very low certainty data, oral doxycycline may help with symptoms like itchiness, burning, or watery eyes, but may induce more side effects.

A review of treatments showed that the anti-mite drug ivermectin can be an effective treatment for reducing symptoms.

Eye drops or ointments containing corticosteroids are frequently used in conjunction with antibiotics and can reduce eyelid inflammation.

The supplement n-acetylcysteine may be effective for blepharitis.
