= Warm compress =

Method of applying heat to the body

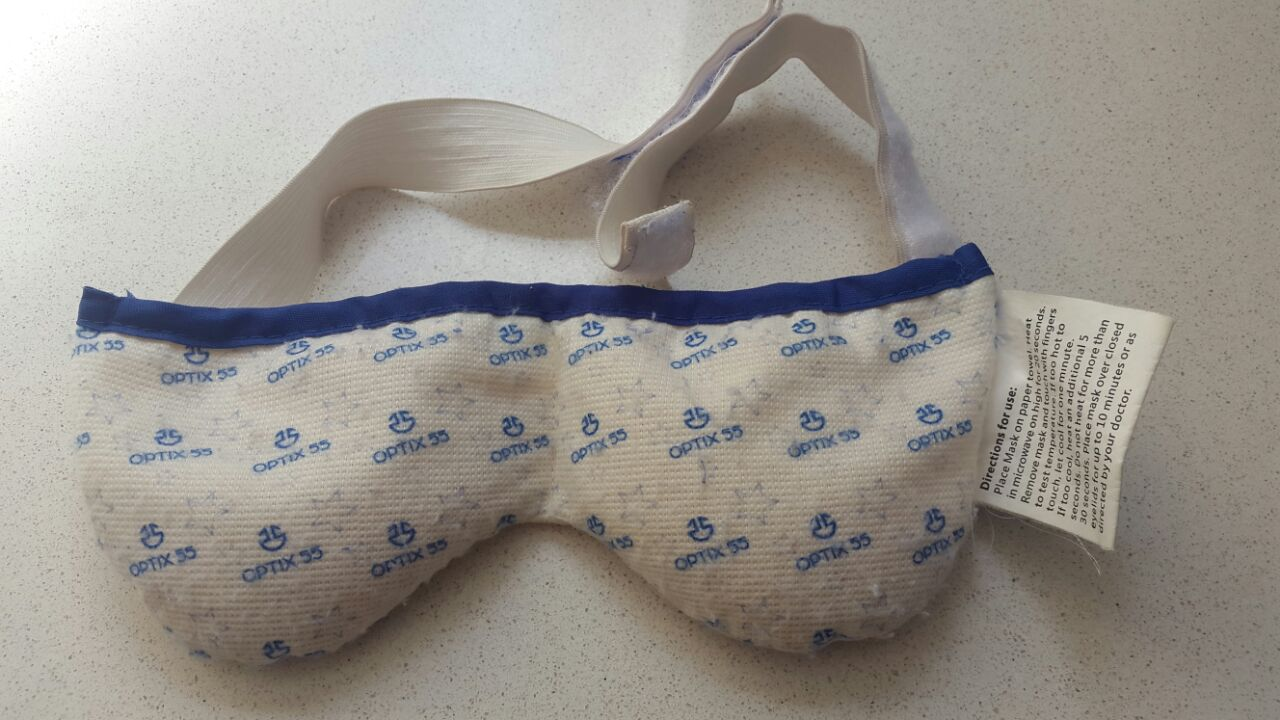
- Microwavable warm compresses used for treatment of different eyelid diseases.

A warm compress is a method of applying heat to the body. Heating sources can include warm water, microwaveable pads, wheat packs and electrical or chemical pads. Some unorthodox methods can include warmed potatoes, uncooked rice, and hard-boiled eggs. The most common warm compress is a warm, wet washcloth.

== Uses ==
Warm compresses are a common non-pharmacological therapy used in the treatment of things such as sports injuries, dental pain, post-operative wound healing, and ophthalmic conditions. They are believed to improve blood flow, increase oxygenation in tissues and help manage inflammation.

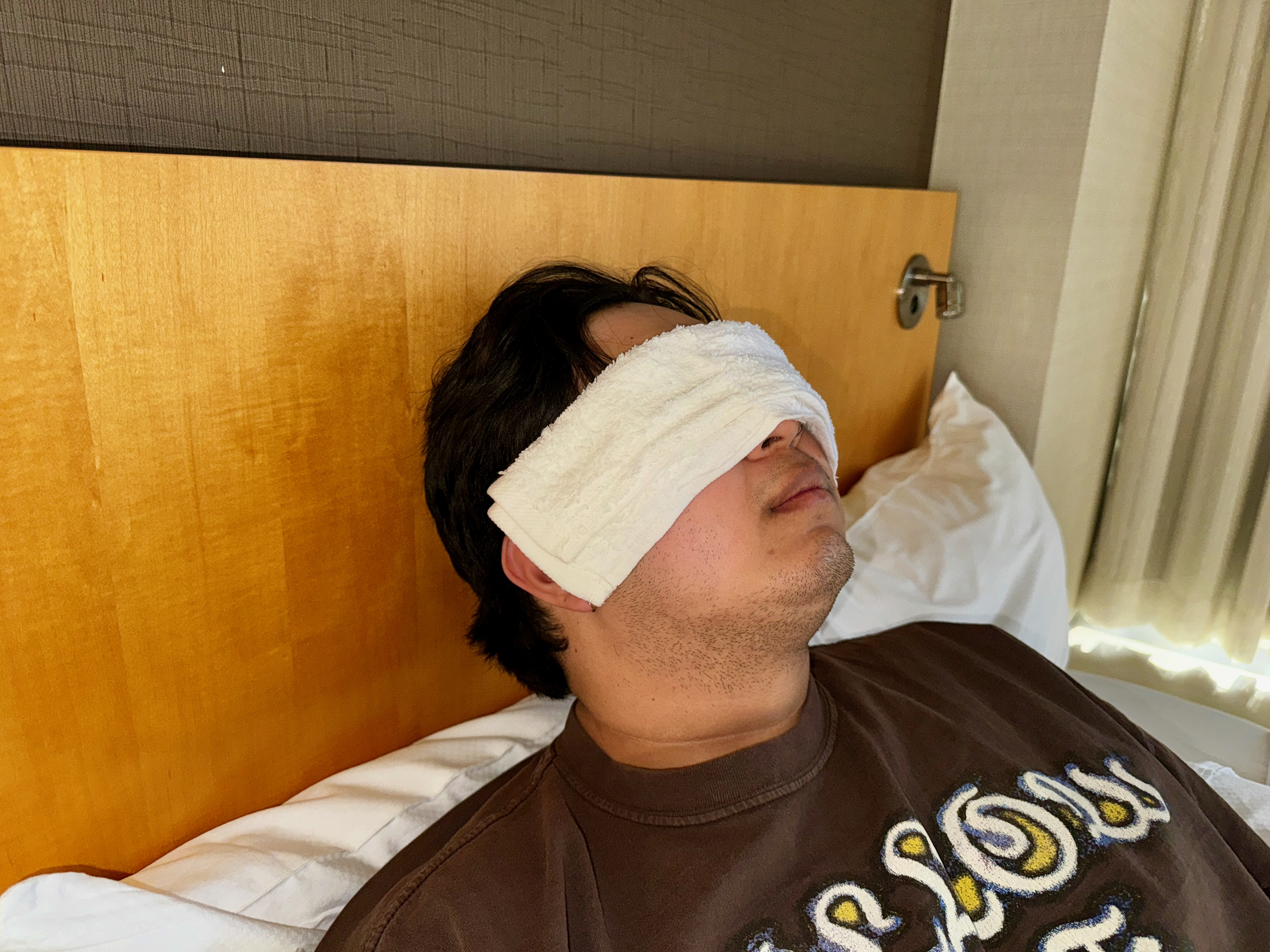
warm compress demonstrated with a warm, wet towel

=== For eye problems ===
Warm compresses are commonly used for the treatment of certain ocular conditions such as:

- dry eyes
- pinkeye (conjunctivitis)
- stye or chalazion
- swollen eyelids (blepharitis)
- meibomian gland dysfunction
- muscle spasms or pain

=== For injury to muscle or joint ===
For both muscle and joint injuries, it is common to alternate both cold and warm compresses to manage inflammation. Non-steroidal anti-inflammatory drugs and corticosteroids may also be used in conjunction.
