= Grey parrot (disambiguation) =

Grey parrot may refer to:

Parrots

- Grey parrot (also Congo grey parrot or African grey parrot) (Psittacus erithacus)
- Timneh parrot (also Timneh grey parrot) (Psittacus timneh)
- Thirioux’s grey parrot (Psittacula bensoni), also known as Mascarene grey parakeet, or Mauritius grey parrot, a little-known extinct parrot

Plants

- Grey parrot-pea (Dillwynia cinerascens), a plant in the pea family (Fabaceae), native to Australia
