= Leioproctus australiensis =

Scientific classification
- Kingdom: Animalia
- Phylum: Arthropoda
- Clade: Pancrustacea
- Class: Insecta
- Order: Hymenoptera
- Family: Colletidae
- Genus: Leioproctus
- Species: L. australiensis

Binomial name
- Leioproctus australiensis (Dalla Torre, 1896)

Synonyms
- Scrapter bicolor Smith, 1862; Macropis australiensis Dalla Torre, 1896; Euryglossidia rectangulata Cockerell, 1910

Species of bee

Leioproctus australiensis, or Leioproctus (Euryglossidia) australiensis, is a species of bee in the family Colletidae and subfamily Colletinae. It is endemic to Australia. It was described by Austrian entomologist Karl Wilhelm von Dalla Torre in 1896.

== Distribution and habitat ==
The species occurs in south-eastern Australia.

== Behaviour ==
The adults are flying mellivores. Flowering plants visited by the bees include Dillwynia retorta and Dillwynia sieberi, as well as Pultenaea species.

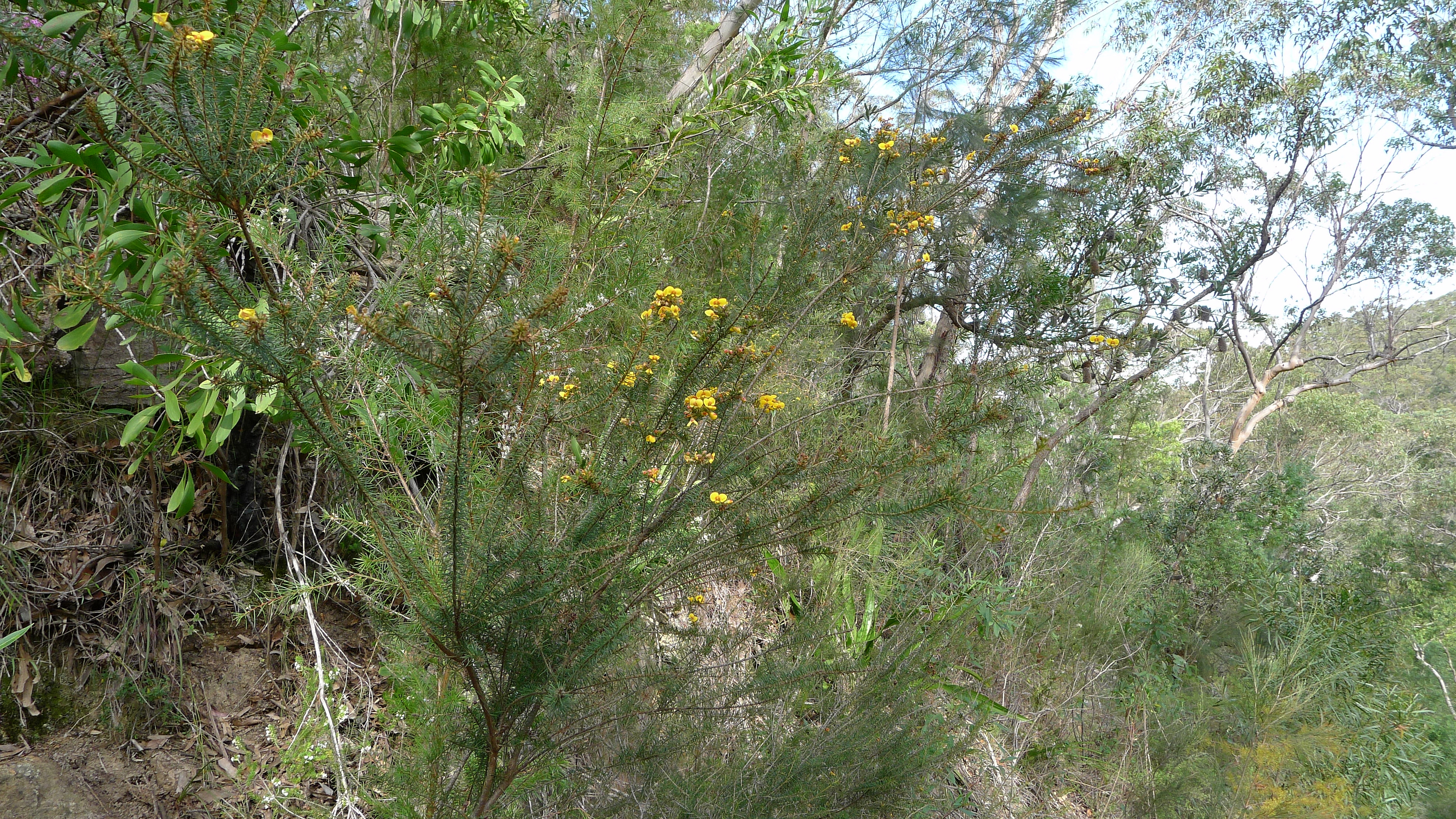
Dillwynia retorta (eggs and bacon), a forage plant of the bees
