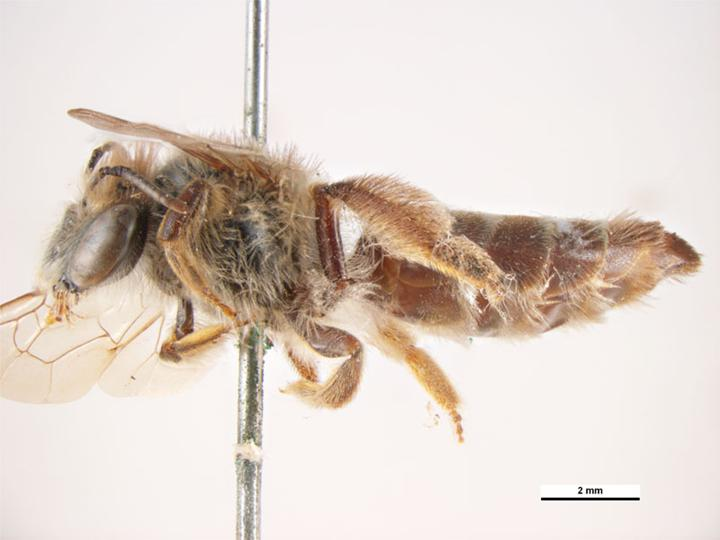
- Female

Scientific classification
- Kingdom: Animalia
- Phylum: Arthropoda
- Clade: Pancrustacea
- Class: Insecta
- Order: Hymenoptera
- Family: Colletidae
- Genus: Leioproctus
- Species: L. advena

Binomial name
- Leioproctus advena (Smith, 1862)

Synonyms
- Andrena advena Smith, 1862; Paracolletes euphenax Cockerell, 1913; Paracolletes scitulus Cockerell, 1921; Paracolletes advena phillipensis Rayment, 1953

= Leioproctus advena =

Species of bee

Leioproctus advena, or Leioproctus (Zosterocolletes) advena, is a species of bee in the family Colletidae and subfamily Colletinae. It is endemic to Australia. It was described by English entomologist Frederick Smith in 1862.

== Distribution and habitat ==
The species occurs across mainland Australia. Type localities include Brisbane and Sandringham, Victoria.

== Behaviour ==
The adults are solitary flying mellivores. They nest gregariously in the ground and have sedentary larvae. Flowering plants visited by the bees include Boronia, Daviesia, Dillwynia, Hibbertia, Leptospermum, Leucopogon and Pultenaea species.

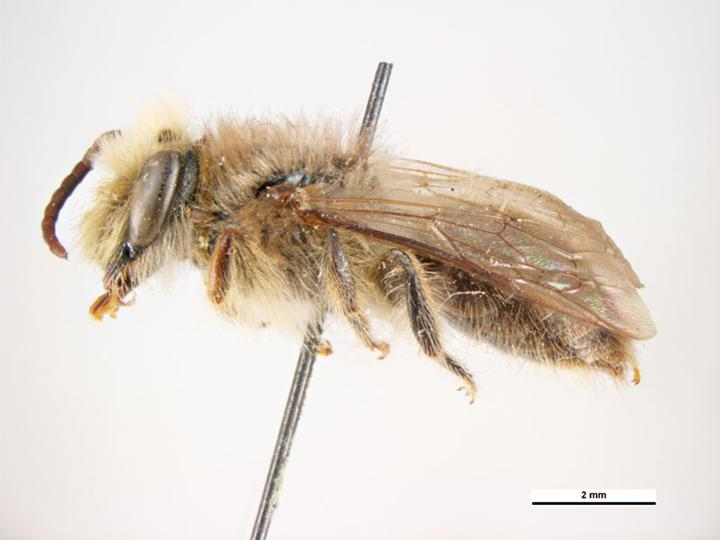
Male
