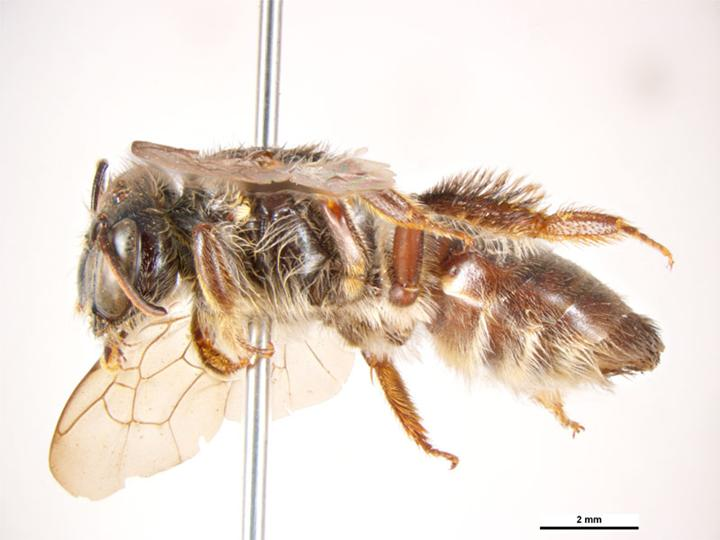
- Female

Scientific classification
- Kingdom: Animalia
- Phylum: Arthropoda
- Clade: Pancrustacea
- Class: Insecta
- Order: Hymenoptera
- Family: Colletidae
- Genus: Leioproctus
- Species: L. nigrofulvus

Binomial name
- Leioproctus nigrofulvus (Cockerell, 1914)

Synonyms
- Paracolletes nigrofulvus Cockerell, 1914; Paracolletes franki Cockerell, 1929; Leioproctus (Leioproctus) frankiellus Michener, 1965

= Leioproctus nigrofulvus =

Species of bee

Leioproctus nigrofulvus, or Leioproctus (Leioproctus) nigrofulvus, is a species of bee in the family Colletidae and subfamily Colletinae. It is endemic to Australia. It was described by British-American entomologist Theodore Dru Alison Cockerell in 1914.

== Description ==
Male body length is 11.5 mm. Colouration is mainly black and dark red, with pale ochraceous to brown and black hair.

== Distribution and habitat ==
The species occurs in eastern Australia. Type localities include Shoalhaven, New South Wales, and Adelaide in South Australia.

== Behaviour ==
The adults are solitary flying mellivores that nest in termite mounds. Flowering plants visited by the bees include Daviesia and Dillwynia species.
