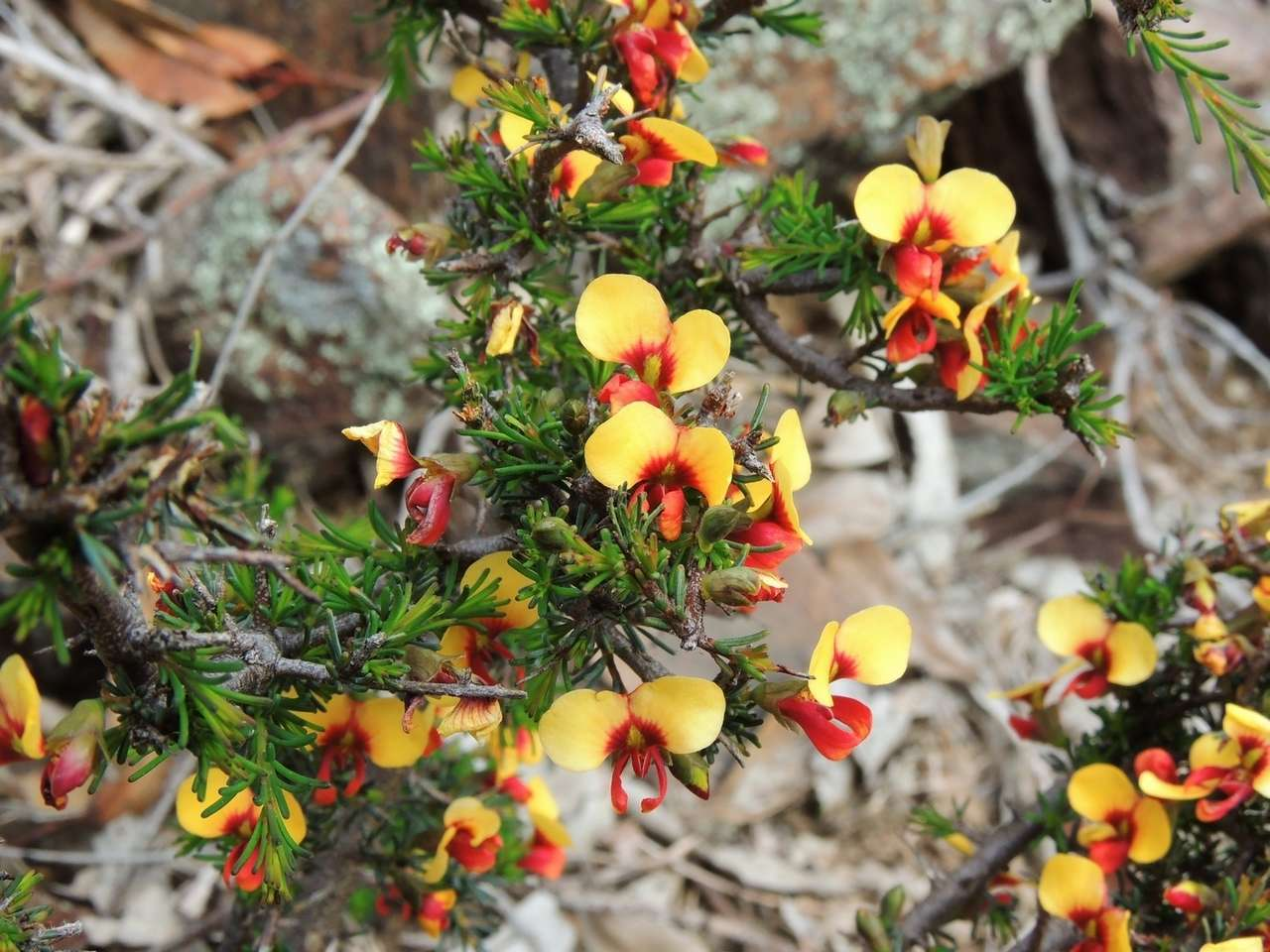

Scientific classification
- Kingdom: Plantae
- Clade: Tracheophytes
- Clade: Angiosperms
- Clade: Eudicots
- Clade: Rosids
- Order: Fabales
- Family: Fabaceae
- Subfamily: Faboideae
- Genus: Dillwynia
- Species: D. ramosissima

Binomial name
- Dillwynia ramosissima Benth.

Synonyms
- Dillwynia floribunda var. spinescens Maiden & Betche; Dillwynia ramosissima Benth. isonym; Dillwynia spinescens (Maiden & Betche) Cheel; Dillwynia spinescens var. inermis Blakely

= Dillwynia ramosissima =

Bushy parrot-pea

Species of flowering plant

Dillwynia ramosissima, commonly known as bushy parrot-pea, is a species of flowering plant in the family Fabaceae and is endemic to south-eastern continental Australia. It is a low-lying to erect shrub with linear to narrow oblong or spatula-shaped leaves and yellow flowers with red markings.

== Description ==
Dillwynia ramosissima is a low-lying to erect shrub that typically grows to a height of 0.4–1.5 m (1 ft 4 in – 4 ft 11 in) with glabrous, often spiny stems. The leaves are linear to narrow oblong or spatula-shaped, 1–10 mm (0.039–0.394 in) long and about 0.5 mm (0.020 in) wide on a petiole about 1 mm (0.039 in) long, and with the edges rolled under. The flowers are arranged singly in leaf axils near the ends of branchlets on a peduncle 0.5–8 mm (0.020–0.315 in) long with bracts about 1 mm (0.039 in) long. The sepals are hairy, 4–5 mm (0.16–0.20 in) long and more or less glabrous, the standard petal is yellow with red veins, 7–10 mm (0.28–0.39 in) long, the wings shorter and yellow and the keel is red. Flowering occurs from August to November and the fruit is an oval pod 5–7 mm (0.20–0.28 in) long.

== Taxonomy and naming ==
Dillwynia ramosissima was first formally described in 1837 by George Bentham in Commentationes de Leguminosarum Generibus. The specific epithet (ramosissima) means "much-branched".

== Distribution ==
This dillwynia grows in heath and forest south from the Cudgegong River in New South Wales and in central Victoria.
