= Dillwynia dillwynioides =

Conservation status
- Priority Three — Poorly Known Taxa (DEC)

Scientific classification
- Kingdom: Plantae
- Clade: Tracheophytes
- Clade: Angiosperms
- Clade: Eudicots
- Clade: Rosids
- Order: Fabales
- Family: Fabaceae
- Subfamily: Faboideae
- Genus: Dillwynia
- Species: D. dillwynioides

Binomial name
- Dillwynia dillwynioides (Meisn.) Druce

Synonyms
- Aotus dillwynioides Meisn.

Species of flowering plant

Dillwynia dillwynioides is a species of flowering plant in the family Fabaceae and is endemic to the south-west of Western Australia. It is a low-lying or erect, spindly shrub with cylindrical, grooved leaves and yellow, red or orange flowers with yellow, red or orange markings.

== Description ==
Dillwynia dillwynioides is a low-lying or erect, spindly shrub that typically grows to a height of 0.3–1.2 m (1 ft 0 in – 3 ft 11 in). The leaves are hairy, more or less cylindrical but with longitudinal grooves on the lower surface, 6–10 mm (0.24–0.39 in) long and 0.5–1 mm (0.020–0.039 in) wide. Each flower is on a pedicel 3.2–3.5 mm (0.13–0.14 in) long with hairy bracteoles 3–4.2 mm (0.12–0.17 in) long, but that fall off as the flower opens. The sepals are hairy, 7.5–8.5 mm (0.30–0.33 in) long and the corolla is mostly yellow, red or orange with yellow, red or orange spots and blotches. The standard petal is 9.5–12.5 mm (0.37–0.49 in) long, the wings 8.5–10 mm (0.33–0.39 in) long and the keel 7.0–7.5 mm (0.28–0.30 in) long. Flowering occurs from August to December.

== Taxonomy and naming ==
This species was first formally described in 1844 by Carl Meissner in Lehmann's Plantae Preissianae and was given the name Aotus dillwynioides. In 1917, George Claridge Druce changed the name to Dillwynia dillwynioides in The Botanical Exchange Club and Society of the British Isles Report for 1916.

== Distribution ==
This dillwynia grows in winter-wet depressions in the Swan Coastal Plain biogeographic region of south-western Western Australia.

== Conservation status ==
This species is classified as "Priority Three" by the Government of Western Australia Department of Parks and Wildlife meaning that it is poorly known and known from only a few locations but is not under imminent threat.
