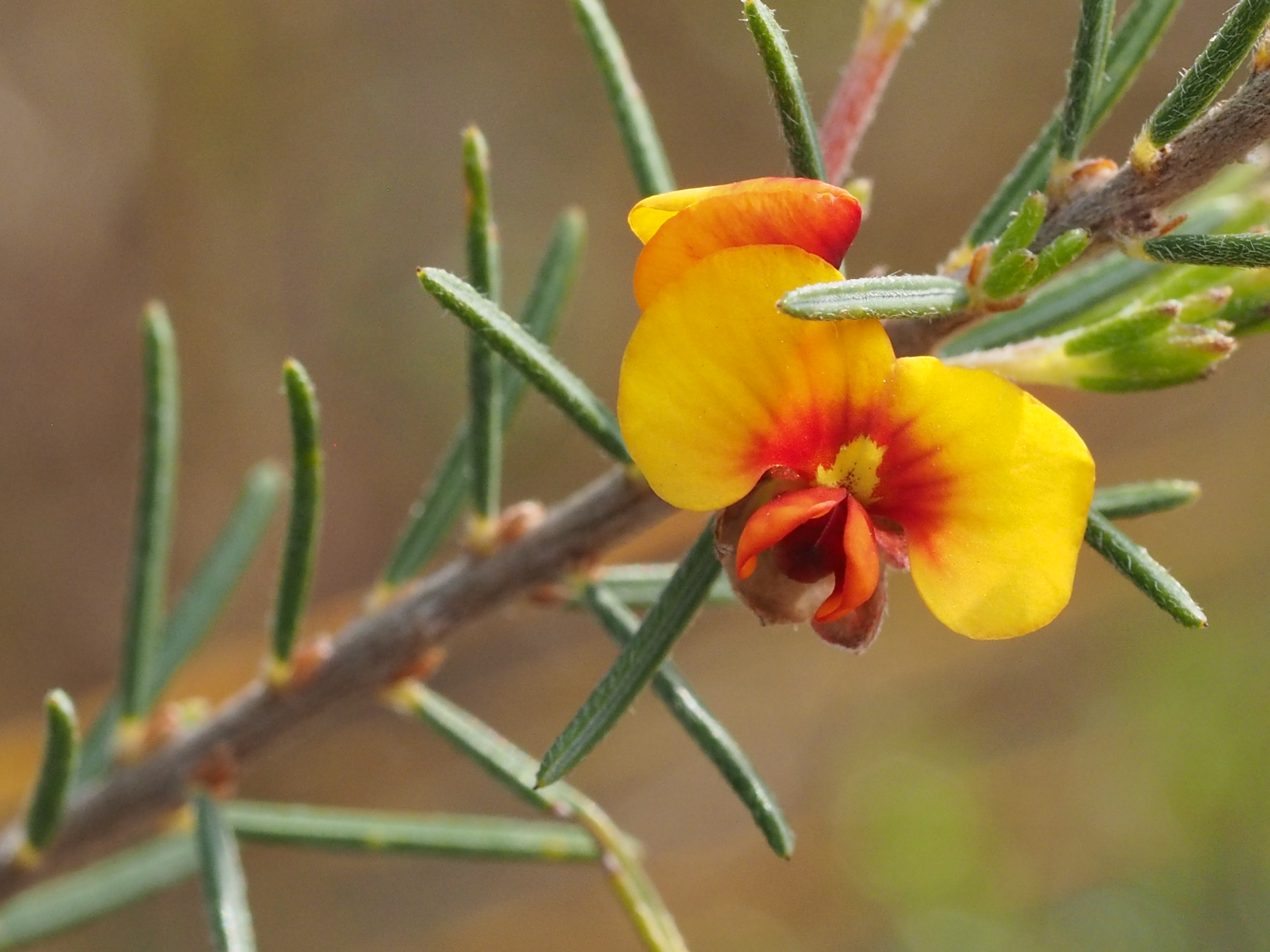
- Dillwynia sericea near the Sandstone Caves

Scientific classification
- Kingdom: Plantae
- Clade: Tracheophytes
- Clade: Angiosperms
- Clade: Eudicots
- Clade: Rosids
- Order: Fabales
- Family: Fabaceae
- Subfamily: Faboideae
- Genus: Dillwynia
- Species: D. sericea

Binomial name
- Dillwynia sericea A.Cunn.

Synonyms
- Aotus wuerthii Regel; Aotus wurthii Joy Thomps. orth. var.; Dillwynia adenophora Endl.; Dillwynia floribunda var. sericea (A.Cunn.) Benth.; Dillwynia rudis var. hispidula DC.; Dillwynia sericea subsp. A; Dillwynia sericea var. glabriflora Blakely; Dillwynia sericea A.Cunn. var. sericea

= Dillwynia sericea =

Showy parrot-pea

Species of flowering plant

Dillwynia sericea, commonly known as showy parrot-pea, is a species of flowering plant in the family Fabaceae and is endemic to south-eastern Australia. It is an erect to low-lying shrub with hairy stems, linear leaves and apricot-coloured flowers, usually with a red centre.

== Description ==
Dillwynia sericea is an erect, to low-lying, heath-like shrub that typically grows to a height of 0.5–1 m (1 ft 8 in – 3 ft 3 in) with stiff branches that are hairy, especially when young. The leaves are linear, mostly 5–20 mm (0.20–0.79 in) long and less than 1 mm (0.039 in) wide. The flowers are usually arranged in leaf axils in pairs, but also sometimes singly or in larger groups, each flower more or less sessile or on a pedicel less than 1 mm (0.039 in) long. Leathery brown bracts 2.5 mm (0.098 in) long are present at first but fall as the flower develops. The sepals are 4–6 mm (0.16–0.24 in) long. The standard petal is nearly twice as long as the sepals, often wider than long, apricot coloured with a red base. The wings are reddish, lance-shaped with the narrower end towards the base, and the keel is about 5 mm (0.20 in) long. Flowering occurs from September to December and the fruit is an oval pod about 5 mm (0.20 in) long, usually containing two seeds.

== Taxonomy and naming ==
Dillwynia sericea was first formally described in 1825 by Allan Cunningham in Barron Field's book, Geographical Memoirs on New South Wales. The specific epithet (sericea) means "silky".

== Distribution ==
Showy parrot-pea grows in heath, woodland and forest and is widespread and common in eastern New South Wales, the Australian Capital Territory, Victoria and eastern Tasmania. It is also found in south-eastern Queensland and south-eastern South Australia.
