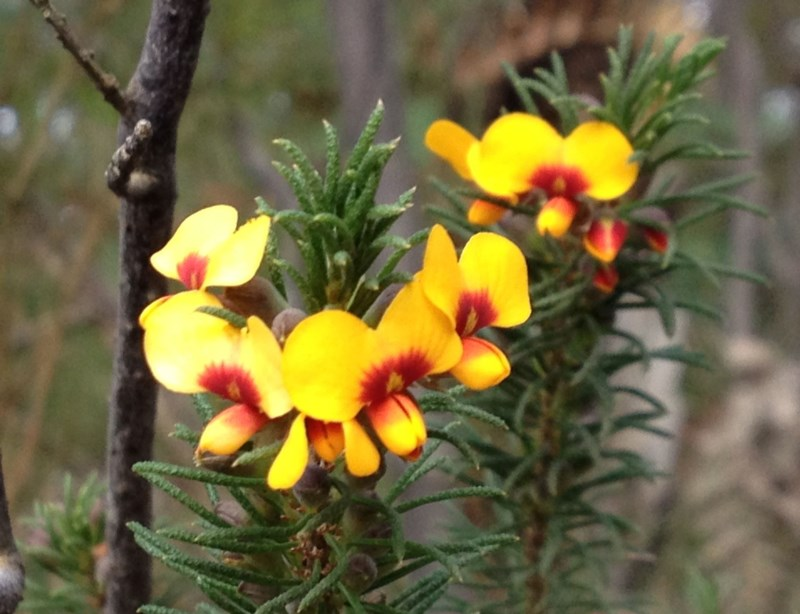

Scientific classification
- Kingdom: Plantae
- Clade: Tracheophytes
- Clade: Angiosperms
- Clade: Eudicots
- Clade: Rosids
- Order: Fabales
- Family: Fabaceae
- Subfamily: Faboideae
- Genus: Dillwynia
- Species: D. acicularis

Binomial name
- Dillwynia acicularis DC.

Synonyms
- Dillwynia acicularis DC. var. acicularis; Dillwynia acicularis var. leptophylla Blakely

= Dillwynia acicularis =

Species of flowering plant

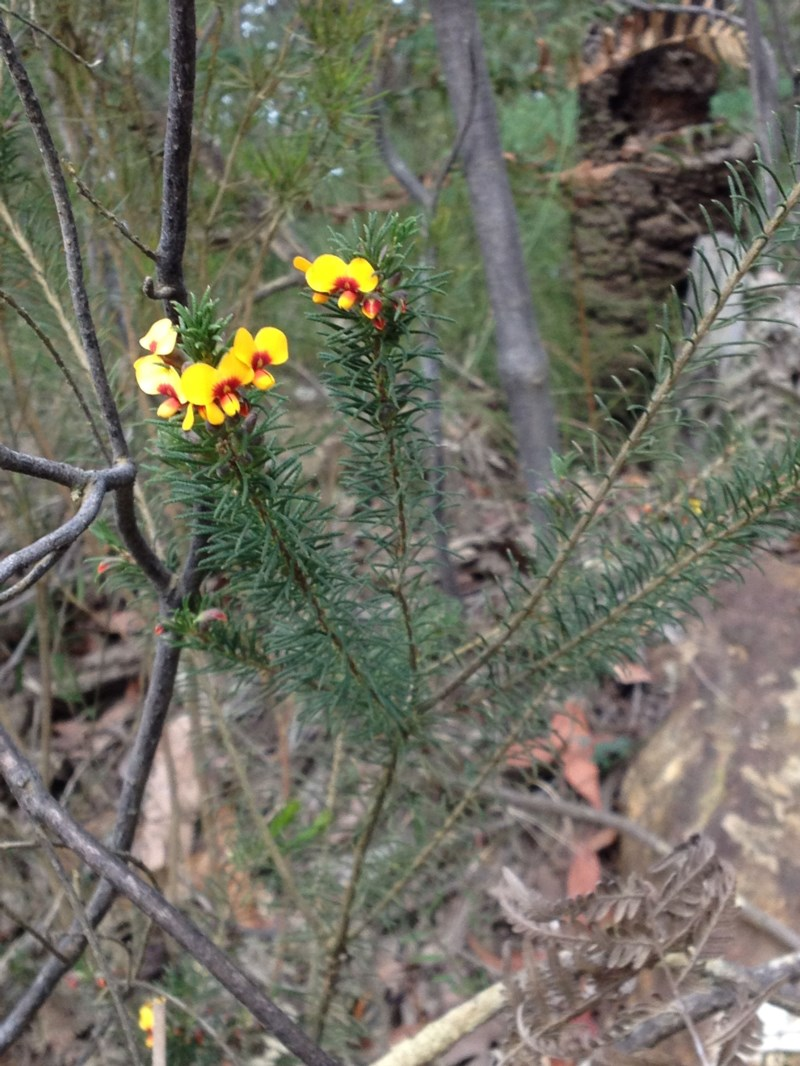
Habit

Dillwynia acicularis is a species of flowering plant in the family Fabaceae and is endemic to New South Wales. It is an erect shrub with linear, grooved leaves and yellow flowers with red markings.

== Description ==
Dillwynia acicularis is an erect shrub that typically grows to a height of 1–3 m (3 ft 3 in – 9 ft 10 in) with hairy stems. The leaves are erect, narrow linear, sometimes triangular in cross-section, 10–35 mm (0.39–1.38 in) long with a longitudinal groove on the upper surface. The flowers are arranged in racemes on the ends of branchlets with leaves at the base, and hairy bracts and bracteoles about 1 mm (0.039 in) long. The sepals are 4–5 mm (0.16–0.20 in) long, and the standard petal is 7–9 mm (0.28–0.35 in) long and the keel is yellow with red markings.

== Taxonomy and naming ==
Dillwynia acicularis was first formally described in 1825 by Augustin Pyramus de Candolle in his Prodromus Systematis Naturalis Regni Vegetabilis. The specific epithet (acicularis) means "needle-pointed".

== Distribution ==
This dillwynia grows in forest on sandstone or granite in the Sydney region, between the Goulburn River, Bargo and Braidwood in eastern New South Wales.
