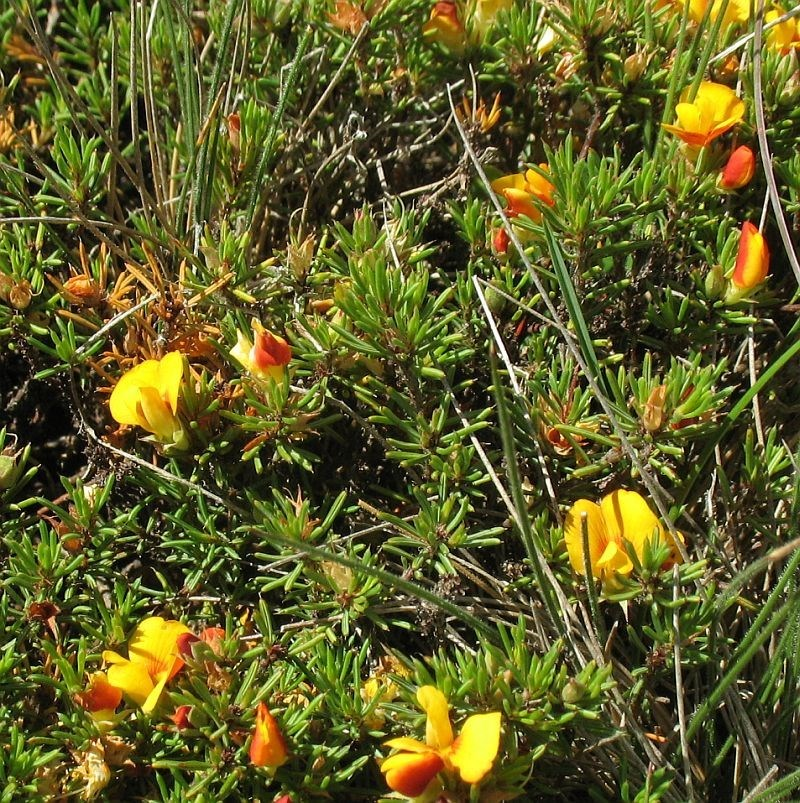
- Dillwynia prostrata in Kosciuszko National Park

Scientific classification
- Kingdom: Plantae
- Clade: Tracheophytes
- Clade: Angiosperms
- Clade: Eudicots
- Clade: Rosids
- Order: Fabales
- Family: Fabaceae
- Subfamily: Faboideae
- Genus: Dillwynia
- Species: D. prostrata

Binomial name
- Dillwynia prostrata Blakely

= Dillwynia prostrata =

Matted parrot-pea

Species of flowering plant

Dillwynia prostrata, commonly known as matted parrot-pea, is a species of flowering plant in the family Fabaceae and is endemic to south-eastern continental Australia. It is a prostrate shrub with hairy stems, linear to narrow oblong or spatula-shaped leaves and yellow and dark red flowers.

== Description ==
Dillwynia prostrata is a prostrate shrub that forms roots along the stems and has hairy stems. The leaves are linear to narrow oblong or spatula-shaped, 2–5 mm (0.079–0.197 in) long and about 0.5 mm (0.020 in) wide. The flowers are arranged on the ends of branchlets and in leaf axils near the ends of branchlets, singly or in groups of up to four, each flower on a pedicel 1–3 mm (0.039–0.118 in) long. The sepals are 4–5 mm (0.16–0.20 in) long, the standard petal 7–10 mm (0.28–0.39 in) long and yellow with red veins near the base. The wings are oblong to egg-shaped, shorter than the standard, and the keel is the shortest and dark red. Flowering occurs from October to December and the fruit is an oval pod 4–6 mm (0.16–0.24 in) long and 3–4 mm (0.12–0.16 in) wide.

== Taxonomy and naming ==
Dillwynia prostrata was first formally described in 1939 by William Blakely in The Australian Naturalist. The specific epithet (prostrata) means 'prostrate' or 'lying along the ground'.

== Distribution and habitat ==
Matted parrot-pea grows in heath and woodland on the Southern Tablelands south from Braidwood in New South Wales and in East Gippsland in the far north east of Victoria.
