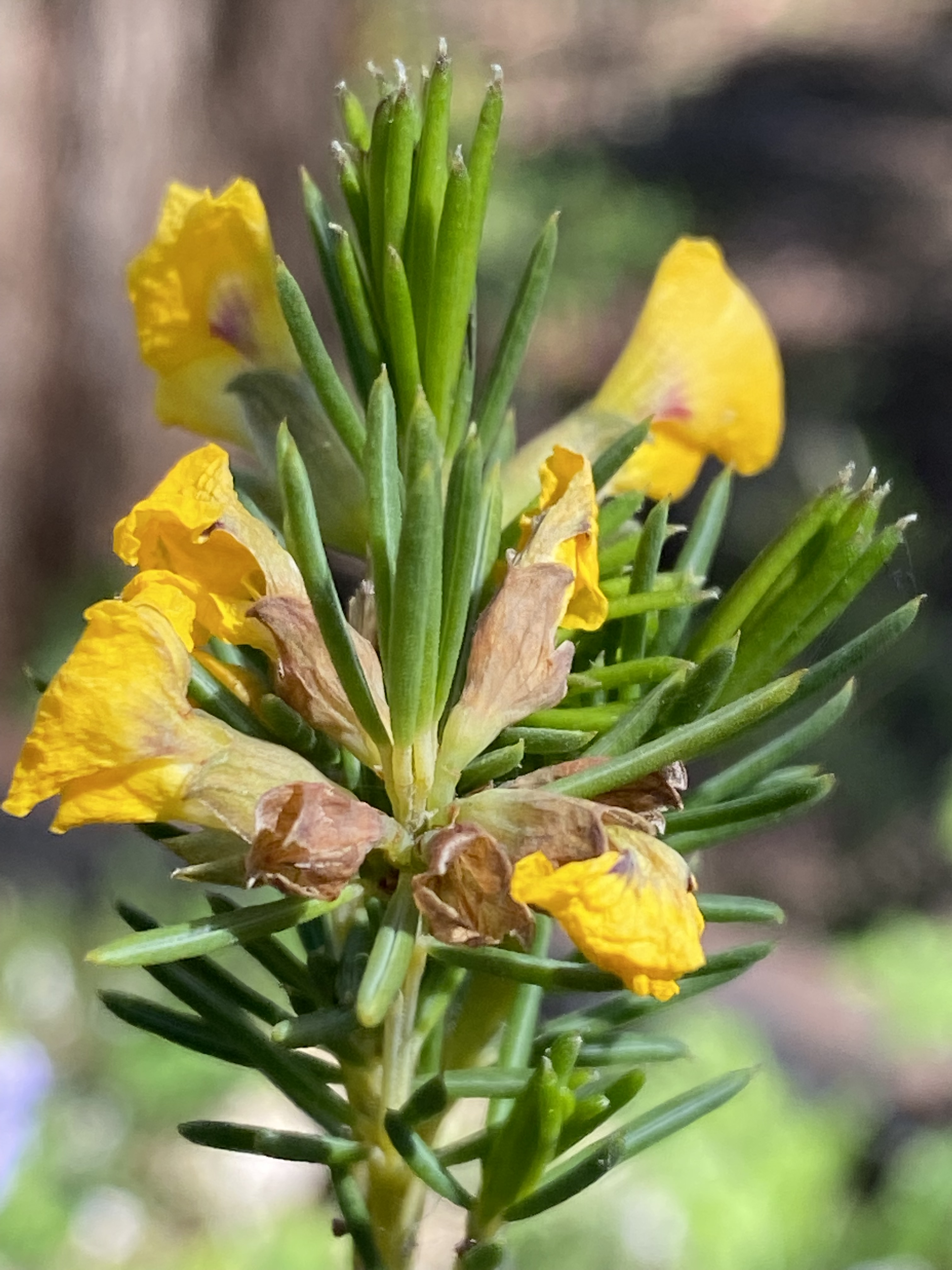

Scientific classification
- Kingdom: Plantae
- Clade: Tracheophytes
- Clade: Angiosperms
- Clade: Eudicots
- Clade: Rosids
- Order: Fabales
- Family: Fabaceae
- Subfamily: Faboideae
- Genus: Dillwynia
- Species: D. crispii

Binomial name
- Dillwynia crispii Jobson & P.H.Weston

= Dillwynia crispii =

Species of flowering plant

Dillwynia crispii is a species of flowering plant in the family Fabaceae and is endemic to Morton National Park in eastern New South Wales. It is an erect shrub with glabrous, linear leaves and yellow flowers with red markings.

== Description ==
Dillwynia crispii is an erect, single-stemmed shrub that typically grows to a height of 0.6–2.5 m (2 ft 0 in – 8 ft 2 in) with silky hairs between prominent leaf scars. The leaves are more or less erect, linear, sometimes triangular in cross-section, 10–18 mm (0.39–0.71 in) long with a longitudinal groove on the upper surface. The flowers are usually arranged in pairs in leaf axils on a peduncle 1–1.5 mm (0.039–0.059 in) long with bracts and bracteoles 1–1.5 mm (0.039–0.059 in) long. The sepals are pinkish or reddish, 5–7 mm (0.20–0.28 in) long and glabrous and the standard petal is 8–10 mm (0.31–0.39 in) long and yellow with red markings.

== Taxonomy and naming ==
Dillwynia crispii was first formally described in 1999 by Peter C. Jobson and Peter H. Weston in the journal Telopea from specimens they collected near Nerriga. The specific epithet (crispii) honours Michael Crisp of the Australian National University.

== Distribution and habitat ==
This dillwynia grows in woodland with a dense understorey, usually near cliffs and is endemic to Morton National Park.
