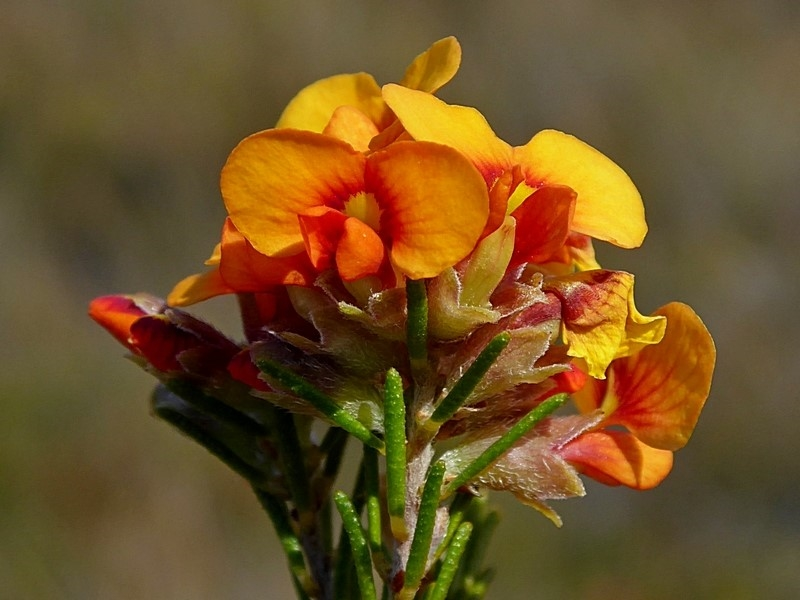
- At Green Cape

Scientific classification
- Kingdom: Plantae
- Clade: Tracheophytes
- Clade: Angiosperms
- Clade: Eudicots
- Clade: Rosids
- Order: Fabales
- Family: Fabaceae
- Subfamily: Faboideae
- Genus: Dillwynia
- Species: D. rudis

Binomial name
- Dillwynia rudis Sieber ex DC.

Synonyms
- Dillwynia rudis Sieber ex DC. var. rudis; Dillwynia rudis var. sanguinea Hereman; Dillwynia sericea subsp.'B'

= Dillwynia rudis =

Species of flowering plant

Dillwynia rudis is a species of flowering plant in the family Fabaceae and is endemic to eastern New South Wales. It is an erect shrub with warty, linear leaves and yellow to orange flowers with red veins.

== Description ==
Dillwynia rudis is an erect shrub that typically grows to a height of 0.15–1.5 m (5.9 in – 4 ft 11.1 in), its stems densely covered with flattened hairs. The leaves are warty, linear, more or less glabrous and 8–18 mm (0.31–0.71 in) long. The flowers are usually arranged in pairs in leaf axils and are more or less sessile, with bracts 1–3 mm (0.039–0.118 in) long. The sepals are 4–7 mm (0.16–0.28 in) long and the standard petal is yellow to orange with red veins, 3–5 mm (0.12–0.20 in) long but much broader. The fruit is a pod 3–6 mm (0.12–0.24 in) long.

== Taxonomy and naming ==
Dillwynia rudis was first formally described in 1825 by Augustin Pyramus de Candolle in his Prodromus Systematis Naturalis Regni Vegetabilis from an unpublished description by Franz Sieber. The specific epithet (rudis) means "rough" or "wild".

== Distribution and habitat ==
This dillwynia grows in heath and woodland between the Sydney region and the Goulburn River area and south along the coast and ranges of New South Wales.
