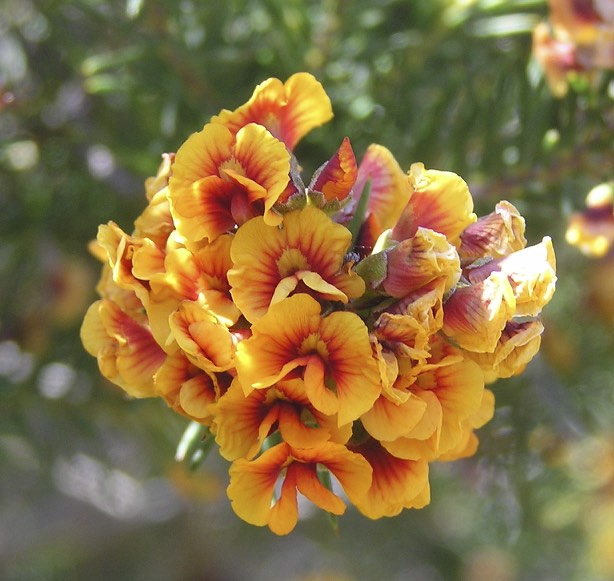
- Flowers near Cape Le Grand

Scientific classification
- Kingdom: Plantae
- Clade: Tracheophytes
- Clade: Angiosperms
- Clade: Eudicots
- Clade: Rosids
- Order: Fabales
- Family: Fabaceae
- Subfamily: Faboideae
- Genus: Dillwynia
- Species: D. pungens

Binomial name
- Dillwynia pungens (Sweet) J.B.Mackay ex Benth.

Synonyms
- Daviesia condensata Turcz.; Dillwynia pungens Lodd., G.Lodd. & W.Lodd. nom. inval., nom. nud.; Dillwynia pungens (Sweet) J.B.Mackay ex Benth. isonym; Eutaxia pungens Sweet

= Dillwynia pungens =

Species of flowering plant

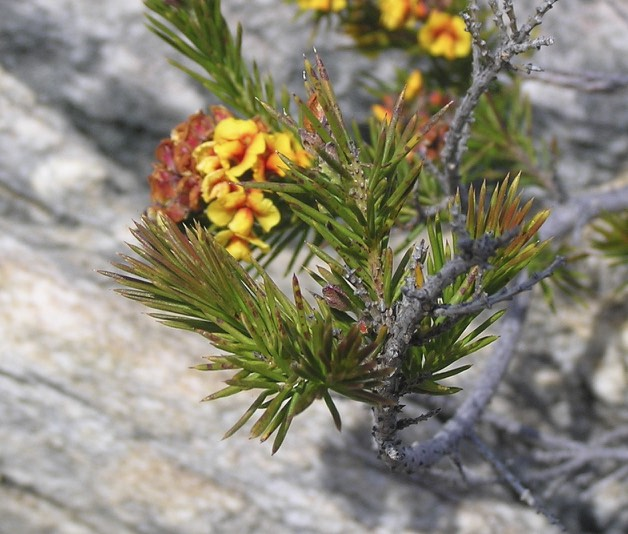
Foliage near Hopetoun

Dillwynia pungens is a species of flowering plant in the family Fabaceae and is endemic to the south coast of Western Australia. It is an erect, spindly shrub with cylindrical leaves and yellow flowers with red or orange markings.

== Description ==
Dillwynia pungens is an erect, spindly shrub that typically grows to a height of 0.5–2 m (1 ft 8 in – 6 ft 7 in). The leaves are glabrous, more or less cylindrical, 8–24 mm (0.31–0.94 in) long, 0.8–1 mm (0.031–0.039 in) wide and sharply-pointed. Each flower is on a hairy pedicel 3–4.2 mm (0.12–0.17 in) long with bracteoles that fall off as the flower opens. The sepals are hairy, 4–4.5 mm (0.16–0.18 in) long and the corolla is mostly yellow, red or orange with yellow, red or orange spots and blotches. The standard petal is 8.5–9 mm (0.33–0.35 in) long, the wings 5.5–8.5 mm (0.22–0.33 in) long and the keel 5.0–5.5 mm (0.20–0.22 in) long. Flowering occurs from August to November.

== Taxonomy and naming ==
This species was first formally described in 1827 by Robert Sweet in his book Flora Australasica and was given the name Eutaxia pungens. In 1837, George Bentham changed the name to Dillwynia pungens in the Commentationes de Leguminosarum Generibus. The specific epithet (pungens) means "ending in a sharp point", referring to the leaves.

== Distribution ==
This dillwynia grows on rocky slopes and ridges in the Esperance Plains and Mallee biogeographic regions on the south coast of Western Australia.

== Conservation status ==
Dillwynia pungens is classified as "not threatened" by the Government of Western Australia Department of Parks and Wildlife.
