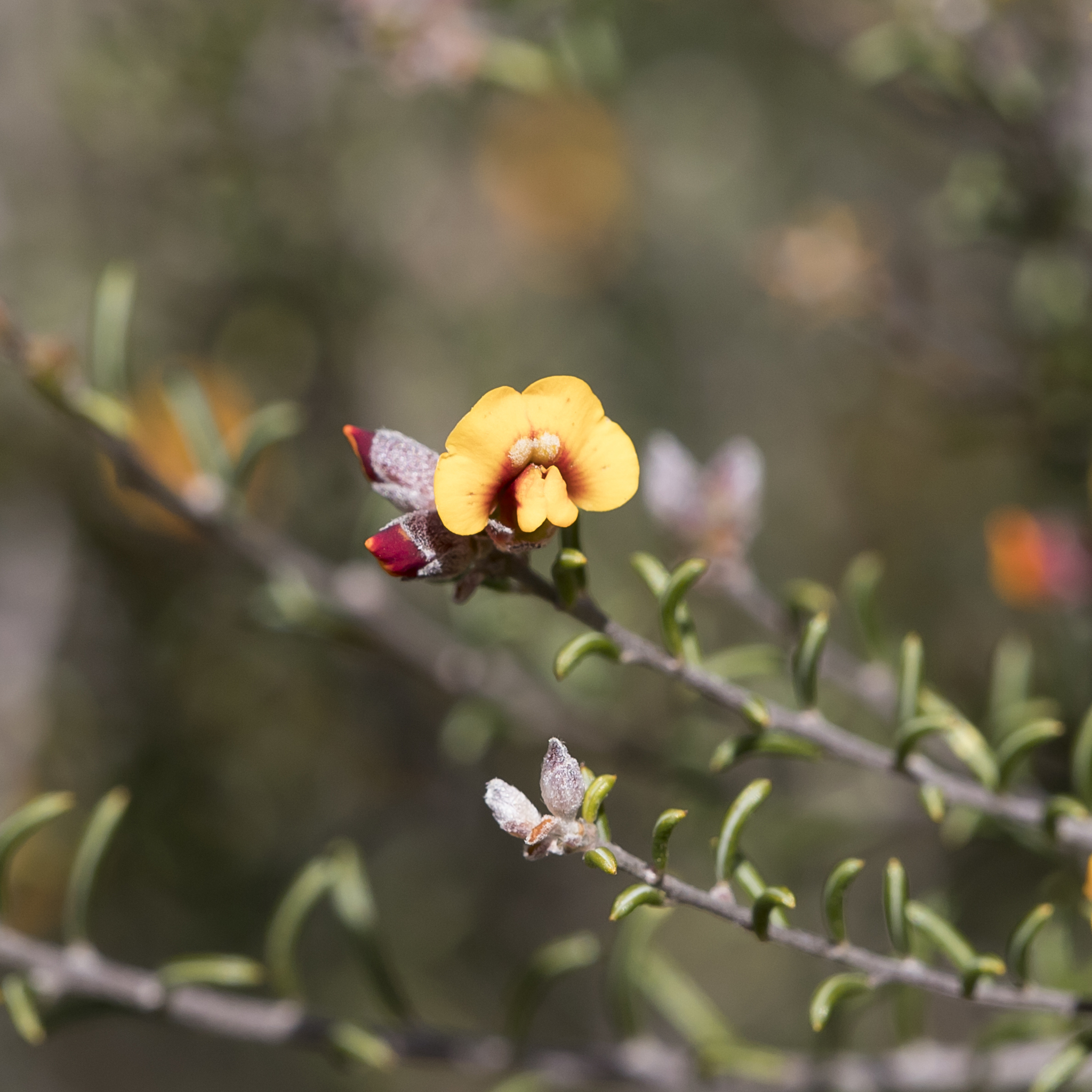
- Dillwynia uncinata in Ferries McDonald Conservation Park

Scientific classification
- Kingdom: Plantae
- Clade: Tracheophytes
- Clade: Angiosperms
- Clade: Eudicots
- Clade: Rosids
- Order: Fabales
- Family: Fabaceae
- Subfamily: Faboideae
- Genus: Dillwynia
- Species: D. uncinata

Binomial name
- Dillwynia uncinata (Turcz.) J.M.Black

Synonyms
- Dillwynia patula (F.Muell. ex D.Dietr.) F.Muell.; Eutaxia patula F.Muell. ex D.Dietr.; Eutaxia sparsifolia F.Muell.; Eutaxia sparsifolia F.Muell. isonym; Eutaxia uncinata Turcz.

= Dillwynia uncinata =

Silky parrot-pea

Species of flowering plant

Dillwynia uncinata, commonly known as silky parrot-pea, is a species of flowering plant in the family Fabaceae and is endemic to southern Australia. It is an erect, spreading shrub with cylindrical leaves and yellow flowers with a red centre.

== Description ==
Dillwynia uncinata is an erect, spreading shrub that typically grows to a height of about 50 cm (20 in) and has silky-hairy upper stems. The leaves are cylindrical, mostly 3–7 mm (0.12–0.28 in) long, about 0.5 mm (0.020 in) wide on a petiole up to 1 mm (0.039 in) long. The flowers are arranged in more or less sessile groups of two to five, each flower on a pedicel 1–2 mm (0.039–0.079 in) long. The sepals are hairy, 4–5 mm (0.16–0.20 in) long and the standard petal is 8–10 mm (0.31–0.39 in) long and yellow with a red centre. The wings are slightly shorter and the keel shortest and reddish. Flowering occurs from September to November.

== Taxonomy and naming ==
This species was first formally described in 1853 by Nikolai Turczaninow in Bulletin de la Société impériale des naturalistes de Moscou and was given the name Eutaxia uncinata. In 1916, John McConnell Black changed the name to Dillwynia uncinata in the Transactions and Proceedings of the Royal Society of South Australia. The specific epithet (uncinata) means "hooked" or "barbed", referring to the leaves.

== Distribution ==
This dillwynia grows in heath, on dunes and in swampy areas in the south-west of Western Australia, in south-eastern South Australia and in the north-west of Victoria.

== Conservation status ==
Dillwynia uncinata is classified as "not threatened" by the Government of Western Australia Department of Parks and Wildlife.
