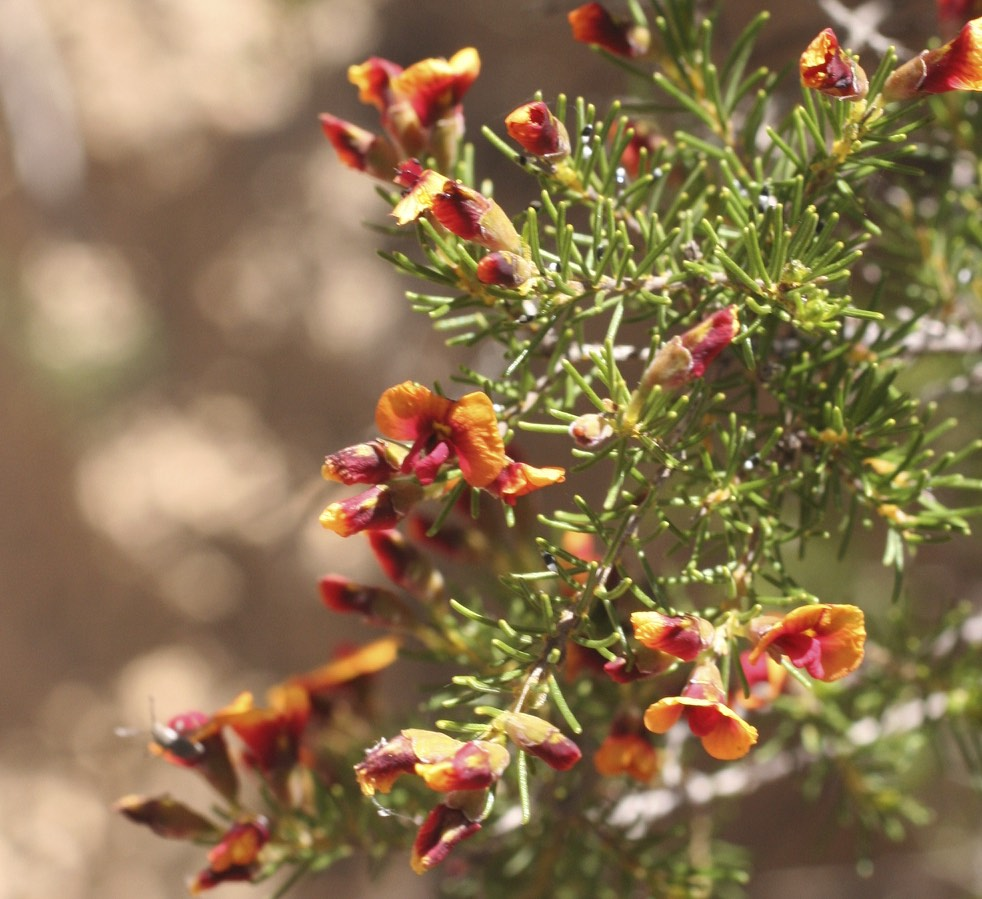

Scientific classification
- Kingdom: Plantae
- Clade: Tracheophytes
- Clade: Angiosperms
- Clade: Eudicots
- Clade: Rosids
- Order: Fabales
- Family: Fabaceae
- Subfamily: Faboideae
- Genus: Dillwynia
- Species: D. laxiflora

Binomial name
- Dillwynia laxiflora Benth.

= Dillwynia laxiflora =

Species of legume

Dillwynia laxiflora is a species of flowering plant in the family Fabaceae and is endemic to Western Australia. It is a prostrate to spreading shrub with needle-shaped leaves and yellow and red flowers.

== Description ==
Dillwynia laxiflora is a prostrate to spreading or scrambling shrub with mostly glabrous branches. The leaves are cylindrical, 3.6–8 mm (0.14–0.31 in) long and 0.5–0.8 mm (0.020–0.031 in) wide with a longitudinal groove on the upper surface. The flowers are mostly yellow or red with yellow or red markings, each flower on a pedicel 3.5–4 mm (0.14–0.16 in) long, the sepals hairy and 3.5–5 mm (0.14–0.20 in) long. The standard petal is 8.5–10 mm (0.33–0.39 in) long, the wings 7–7.5 mm (0.28–0.30 in) long and the keel 5–6 mm (0.20–0.24 in) long. There are ten stamens and the style is hairy and 1.5–1.8 mm (0.059–0.071 in) long. Flowering occurs in October and the fruit is a follicle that is not constricted between the seeds.

== Taxonomy ==
Dillwynia laxiflora was first described in 1837 by George Bentham in Charles von Hügel's Botanisches Archiv der Gartenbaugesellschaft der Ossterreichischen Kaiserstaates. The specific epithet (laxiflora) means "wide or open-flowered".

== Distribution and habitat ==
This dillwynia grows in sandy or gravelly soils on hillcrests in the south-west of Western Australia.
