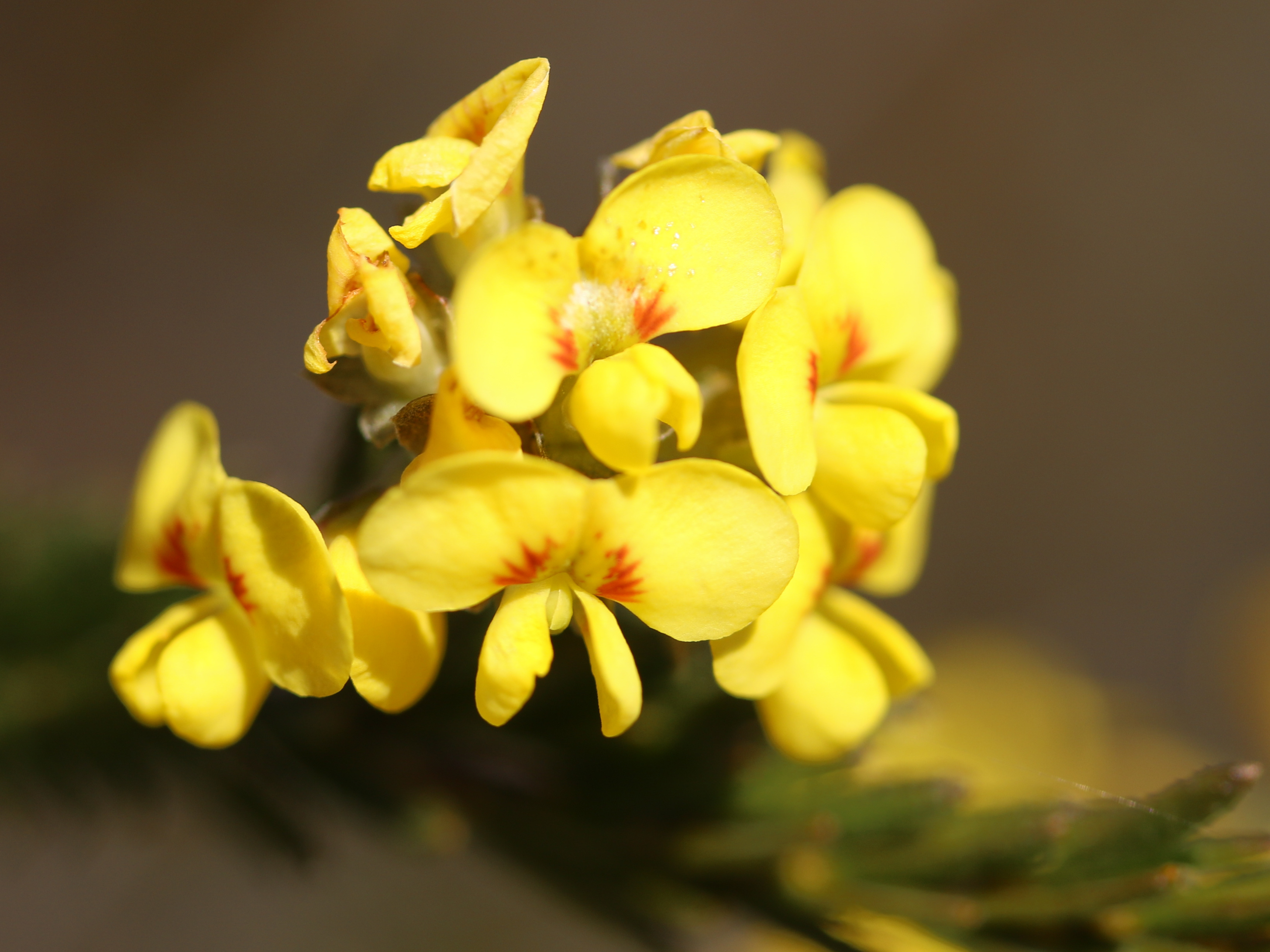
- Ku-ring-gai Chase National Park, Australia

Scientific classification
- Kingdom: Plantae
- Clade: Tracheophytes
- Clade: Angiosperms
- Clade: Eudicots
- Clade: Rosids
- Order: Fabales
- Family: Fabaceae
- Subfamily: Faboideae
- Genus: Dillwynia
- Species: D. elegans

Binomial name
- Dillwynia elegans Endl.

= Dillwynia elegans =

Species of legume

Dillwynia elegans, also known as parrot-pea or eggs and bacon, is a species of flowering plant in the family Fabaceae and is endemic to eastern New South Wales. It is an erect shrub with more or less cylindrical, grooved leaves and yellow flowers with red markings.

== Description ==
Dillwynia elegans is an erect shrub that typically grows to a height of 0.2–2.0 m (7.9 in – 6 ft 6.7 in) and has stems that are hairy when young but become glabrous later. The leaves are crowded, linear, more or less cylindrical with a longitudinal groove and 5–22 mm (0.20–0.87 in) long. The flowers are arranged in pairs in leaf axils, in clusters near the ends of branches. The flowers are on peduncles with egg-shaped to lance-shaped bracts 1–2 mm (0.039–0.079 in) long and shorter bracteoles. The flowers are yellow with red markings, the sepals 4–7 mm (0.16–0.28 in) long and the standard petal 4–7 mm (0.16–0.28 in) long but much broader.

== Taxonomy ==
Dillwynia elegans was first formally described in 1839 by Stephan Endlicher in Novarum stirpium decades editae a Museo Caesario Palatino Vindobonensi from a specimen growing in Charles von Hügel's garden. The specific epithet (floribunda) means "profusely flowering".

This species is regarded as a synonym of Dillwynia floribunda var. teretifolia (DC.) Blakely by the National Herbarium of New South Wales.

== Distribution and habitat ==
The native range of D. elegans is from Port Jackson to areas east of Rylstone, where it grows in rocky sandstone hills in heath to dry sclerophyll forest.

== Use in horticulture ==
Dillwynias are not often grown in cultivation. They can be propagated from scarified seed and grown in partially shaded to sunny areas where they produce vibrant yellow flowers. Germination occurs 3-4 weeks after the seeds have been planted. Most species will tolerate heavy pruning. The flowering time is between spring and mid-winter.
