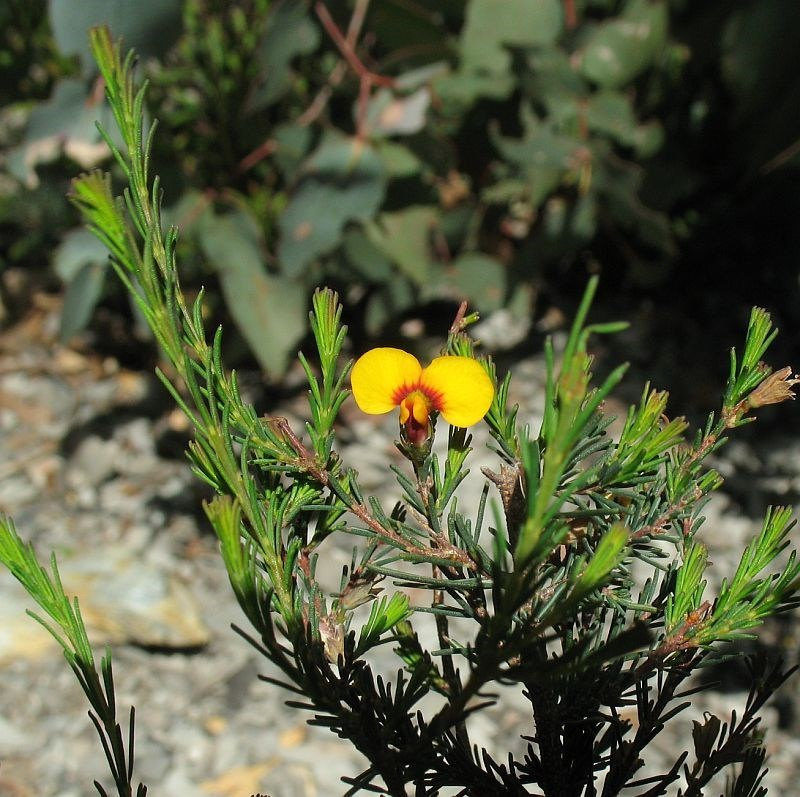

Scientific classification
- Kingdom: Plantae
- Clade: Tracheophytes
- Clade: Angiosperms
- Clade: Eudicots
- Clade: Rosids
- Order: Fabales
- Family: Fabaceae
- Subfamily: Faboideae
- Genus: Dillwynia
- Species: D. glaucula

Binomial name
- Dillwynia glaucula Jobson & P.H.Weston

= Dillwynia glaucula =

Michelago parrot-pea

Species of legume

Dillwynia glaucula, commonly known as Michelago parrot-pea, is a species of flowering plant in the family Fabaceae and is endemic to south-eastern New South Wales. It is an erect shrub with lenticels on the stems, linear, grooved leaves and yellow flowers with red markings.

== Description ==
Dillwynia glaucula is an erect shrub that typically grows to a height of 0.75–2.3 m (2 ft 6 in – 7 ft 7 in) and has glabrous stems with conspicuous yellow lenticels. The leaves are linear, triangular in cross-section 4.5–7.5 mm (0.18–0.30 in) long with a longitudinal groove on the upper surface and glaucous when young. The flowers are arranged singly in upper leaf axils on a peduncle 2–2.5 mm (0.079–0.098 in) long with egg-shaped bracts 0.5–1 mm (0.020–0.039 in) long and similar bracteoles. The flowers are yellow with red markings, the sepals 3.5–6 mm (0.14–0.24 in) long and the standard petal 4.5–5.5 mm (0.18–0.22 in) long but much broader.

== Taxonomy ==
Dillwynia glaucula was first formally described in 1998 by Peter Craig Jobson and Peter Henry Weston in the journal Telopea from specimens they collected near Windellama in 1997. The specific epithet (glaucula) is the diminutive form of the Latin word glaucus meaning "bluish-green", and refers to the colour of the young leaves of this species.

== Distribution and habitat ==
This dillwynia grows in woodland near Windellama, Michelago and Numeralla on the Southern Tablelands of New South Wales.

== Conservation status ==
Dillwynia glaucula is listed as "endangered" under the New South Wales Government Threatened Species Conservation Act 1995.
