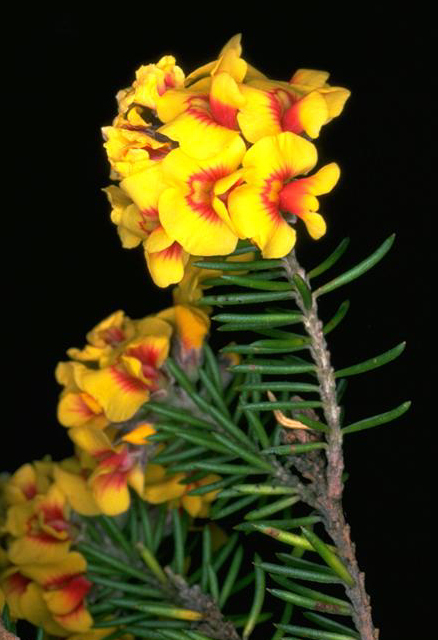
- In the Gibraltar Range National Park

Scientific classification
- Kingdom: Plantae
- Clade: Tracheophytes
- Clade: Angiosperms
- Clade: Eudicots
- Clade: Rosids
- Order: Fabales
- Family: Fabaceae
- Subfamily: Faboideae
- Genus: Dillwynia
- Species: D. rupestris

Binomial name
- Dillwynia rupestris Jobson & P.H.Weston

= Dillwynia rupestris =

Species of flowering plant

Dillwynia rupestris is a species of flowering plant in the family Fabaceae and is endemic to the Gibraltar Range National Park in New South Wales. It is an erect, single-stemmed shrub with linear leaves and yellow flowers with red markings.

== Description ==
Dillwynia rupestris is a robust, erect, single-stemmed shrub that typically grows to a height of 0.5–2.5 m (1 ft 8 in – 8 ft 2 in) with prominent flanges on the stems. The leaves are linear, more or less cylindrical, 10–15 mm (0.39–0.59 in) long on a petiole 1–2 mm (0.039–0.079 in) long, and with a short, sharp point on the end. The flowers are arranged on the ends of branchlets in racemes of between three and eighteen, each flower on a hairy pedicel 1–3 mm (0.039–0.118 in) long with bracts and bracteoles 1–2 mm (0.039–0.079 in) long. The sepals are grey to greyish-black and 3.5–6 mm (0.14–0.24 in) long. The standard petal is 6–9 mm (0.24–0.35 in) long, 8–13 mm (0.31–0.51 in) wide and yellow with a narrow red crescent. Flowering occurs from mid-September to early October and the fruit is an oval pod 4.5–6.0 mm (0.18–0.24 in) long.

== Taxonomy and naming ==
Dillwynia rupestris was first formally described in 1999 by Peter C. Jobson and Peter H. Weston in the journal Telopea from specimens collected on the side of the Gwydir Highway in the Gibraltar Range National Park in 1998. The specific epithet (rupestris) means "rocky", referring to the preferred granite habitat of this species.

== Distribution and habitat ==
This dillwynia grows in shrubland, forest or heath and is only known from the Gibraltar Range National Park.
