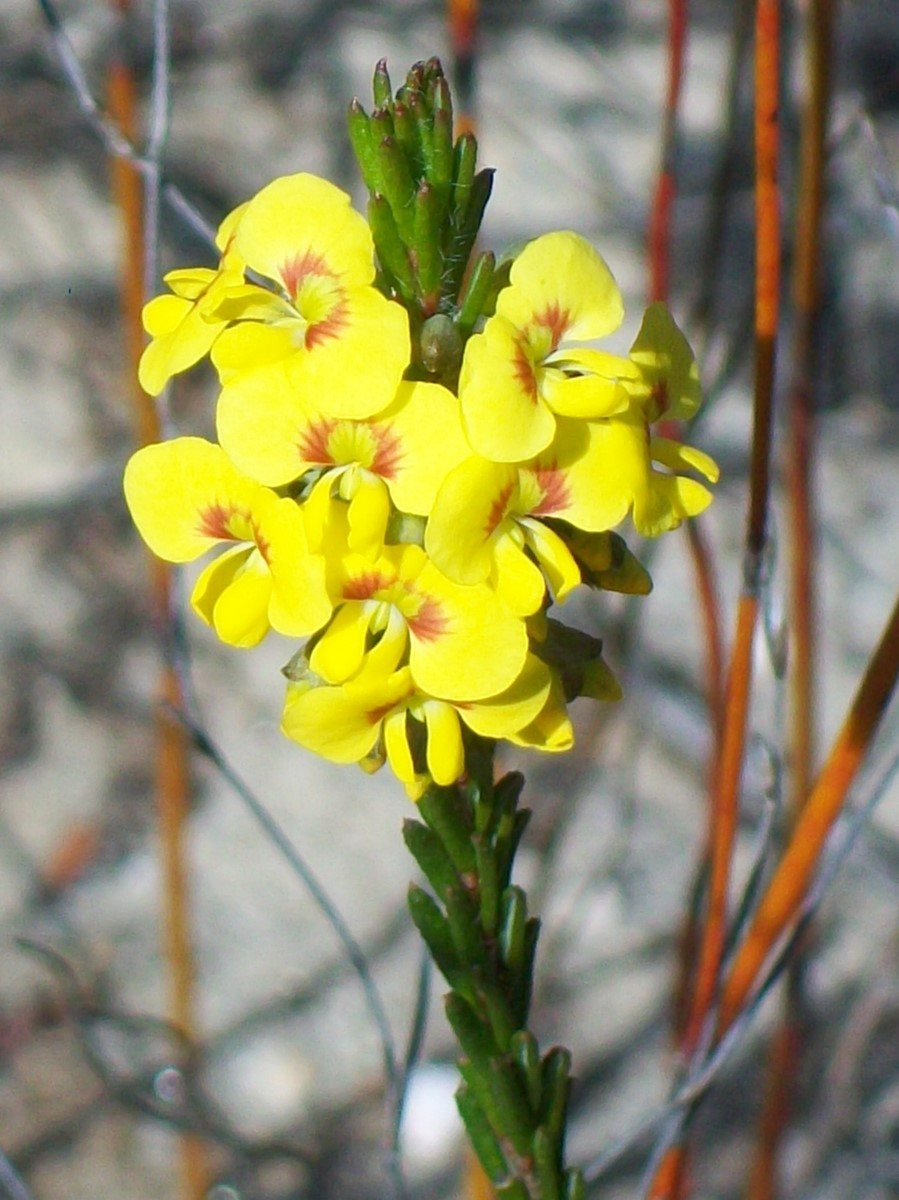
- In Ku-ring-gai Chase National Park

Scientific classification
- Kingdom: Plantae
- Clade: Tracheophytes
- Clade: Angiosperms
- Clade: Eudicots
- Clade: Rosids
- Order: Fabales
- Family: Fabaceae
- Subfamily: Faboideae
- Genus: Dillwynia
- Species: D. floribunda

Binomial name
- Dillwynia floribunda Sm.

Synonyms
- List: Dillwynia floribunda var. brevifolia (DC.) Blakely; Dillwynia floribunda Sm. var. floribunda; Dillwynia floribunda var. longifolia Blakely; Dillwynia floribunda var. teretifolia (DC.) Blakely; Dillwynia floribunda var. typica Regel nom. inval.; Dillwynia hispidula Benth. nom. inval., pro syn.; Dillwynia rudis var. brevifolia DC.; Dillwynia rudis var. teretifolia DC.; Dillwynia teretifolia DC. nom. inval., pro syn.

= Dillwynia floribunda =

Species of legume

Dillwynia floribunda is a species of flowering plant in the family Fabaceae and is endemic to eastern Australia. It is an erect shrub with hairy stems, crowded, grooved, linear leaves and yellow flowers with red markings.

== Description ==
Dillwynia floribunda is an erect shrub that typically grows to a height of 0.2–2.5 m (7.9 in – 8 ft 2.4 in) and has hairy stems. The leaves are crowded along the branches, linear, oval in cross-sectiom, with a longitudinal groove on the upper surface, 5–20 mm (0.20–0.79 in) long and mostly glabrous. The flowers are arranged in pairs in leaf axils near the ends of branches but often extending down the branches. The flowers are sessile or on a very short peduncle with bracts 1–2 mm (0.039–0.079 in) long and shorter bracteoles. The sepals are 4–7 mm (0.16–0.28 in) long and have a few long, fine hairs and the standard petal 7–12 mm (0.28–0.47 in) long. The fruit is a pod 4–7 mm (0.16–0.28 in) long.

== Taxonomy ==
Dillwynia floribunda was first formally described in 1805 by James Edward Smith in the Annals of Botany from specimens collected at Port Jackson. The specific epithet (floribunda) means "many flowers".

== Distribution and habitat ==
This dillwynia mainly grows in heath and woodland and is found in coastal areas and on the Central Tablelands of New South, and in south-eastern Queensland.
