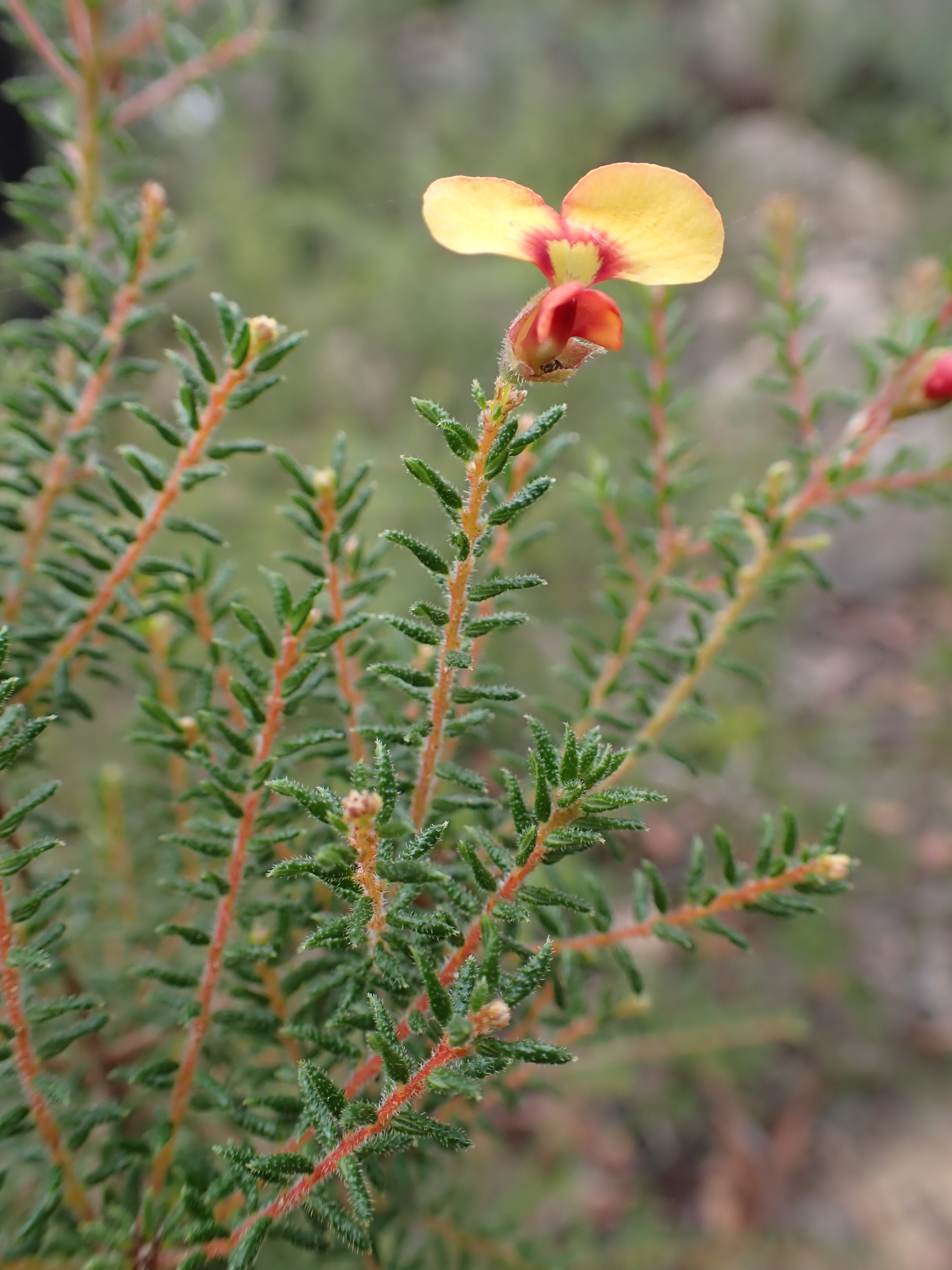
- Dillwynia phylicoides in Cathedral Rock National Park

Scientific classification
- Kingdom: Plantae
- Clade: Tracheophytes
- Clade: Angiosperms
- Clade: Eudicots
- Clade: Rosids
- Order: Fabales
- Family: Fabaceae
- Subfamily: Faboideae
- Genus: Dillwynia
- Species: D. phylicoides

Binomial name
- Dillwynia phylicoides A.Cunn.

Synonyms
- List: Dillwynia ericifolia var. phylicoides (A.Cunn.) Benth.; Dillwynia phylicoides var. leiocalyx Blakely; Dillwynia phylicoides A.Cunn. var. phylicoides; Dillwynia retorta subsp. 'B'; Dillwynia retorta subsp. 'E'; Dillwynia retorta var. phylicoides (A.Cunn.) Joy Thomps.; Dillwynia speciosa Paxton nom. inval., nom. nud.; Dillwynia speciosa Paxton

= Dillwynia phylicoides =

Small-leaf parrot-pea

Species of plant

Dillwynia phylicoides, commonly known as small-leaf parrot-pea, is a species of flowering plant in the family Fabaceae and is endemic to eastern Australia. It is an erect to open shrub with twisted, linear to narrow oblong leaves, and yellow and red flowers.

== Description ==
Dillwynia phylicoides is an erect to open shrub that typically grows to a height of up to 1.5 m (4 ft 11 in) and has stiff, spreading hairs on the stems. The leaves are twisted, linear to narrow oblong, 3–8 mm (0.12–0.31 in) long, about 0.5 mm (0.020 in) wide on a petiole 0.2–0.5 mm (0.0079–0.0197 in) long. The flowers are arranged singly or in clusters of up to eight in leaf axils near the ends of branchlets on a pedicel 1–2 mm (0.039–0.079 in) long with bracts and bracteoles 1–2 mm (0.039–0.079 in) long. The sepals are 4–6 mm (0.16–0.24 in) long with stiff hairs on the outside and the standard petal is 7–12 mm (0.28–0.47 in) long and yellow with red veins. The wings are yellow and red and shorter than the standard, and the keel is orange to purplish-brown. Flowering occurs from September to December and the fruit is an oval pod 4–7 mm (0.16–0.28 in) long.

== Taxonomy ==
Dillwynia phylicoides was formally described in 1825 by botanist Allan Cunningham in Barron Field's Geographical Memoirs on New South Wales based on plant material he collected from hills near Bathurst. The specific epithet (phylicoides) means "Phylica-like".

== Distribution and habitat ==
Small-leaf parrot-pea occurs in dry forest and woodland in Queensland, on the tablelands of New South Wales and the Australian Capital Territory, and in eastern inland Victoria.
