= Dillwynia trichopoda =

Scientific classification
- Kingdom: Plantae
- Clade: Tracheophytes
- Clade: Angiosperms
- Clade: Eudicots
- Clade: Rosids
- Order: Fabales
- Family: Fabaceae
- Subfamily: Faboideae
- Genus: Dillwynia
- Species: D. trichopoda

Binomial name
- Dillwynia trichopoda (Blakely) Jobson & P.H.Weston

Synonyms
- Dillwynia parvifolia var. trichopoda Blakely

Species of plant

Dillwynia trichopoda is a shrub in the plant family Fabaceae that is native to New South Wales, Australia.

== Description ==
This woody shrub grows up to one meter tall and has thin leaves that are curled in a spiral. Its leaves range from 2 mm to 5 mm long and are smooth. The leaves are also alternate.

The plant's branches are long and narrow. Its flowers are in clusters of one to six individual flowers, each often have a bract under them. The flowers are red, orange, and/or yellow like other species in the genus Dillwynia.

Additionally, like other Dillwynia species, the flowers of Dillwynia trichopoda eventually produce a seed pod that is 4-5 mm long.

== Habitat and distribution ==
Dillwynia trichopoda is native to the eastern half of New South Wales where it grows in dry forests and bushlands in skeletal soils. It almost never grows on coastal headlands. This shrub has also been sighted in some parts of Queensland.

== Cultivation ==
Despite not being a commonly cultivated plant, Dillwynia trichopoda can be grown in gardens. It can be grown in dry soils in sunny or semi-sunny conditions, and it can tolerate some heavy pruning.
