= Dillwynia stipulifera =

Scientific classification
- Kingdom: Plantae
- Clade: Tracheophytes
- Clade: Angiosperms
- Clade: Eudicots
- Clade: Rosids
- Order: Fabales
- Family: Fabaceae
- Subfamily: Faboideae
- Genus: Dillwynia
- Species: D. stipulifera

Binomial name
- Dillwynia stipulifera Blakely

Species of flowering plant

Dillwynia stipulifera is a species of flowering plant in the family Fabaceae and is endemic to New South Wales. It is an erect to spreading shrub with hairy stems, linear leaves and yellow flowers with red markings.

== Description ==
Dillwynia stipulifera is an erect to spreading shrub that typically grows to a height of 30–50 cm (12–20 in) with silky-hairy stems. The leaves are linear, 7–15 mm (0.28–0.59 in) long with stipules 0.5–1.5 mm (0.020–0.059 in) long. The flowers are arranged in pairs in leaf axils near the ends of branchlets, forming a spherical cluster. There are bracts and bracteoles 1–1.5 mm (0.039–0.059 in) long and the sepals are 5–7 mm (0.20–0.28 in) long. The standard petal is yellow with red markings, 8–10 mm (0.31–0.39 in) long but broader than long.

== Taxonomy and naming ==
Dillwynia stipulifera was first formally described in 1939 by William Blakely in the journal The Australian Naturalist from specimens collected "between Clarence and Wolgan" by Joseph Maiden in 1906.

== Distribution and habitat ==
This dillwynia grows in swampy heath over sandstone near Lithgow and in the Budawang Range. It is one of the species present in the endangered Newnes Plateau Shrub Swamp ecological community.
