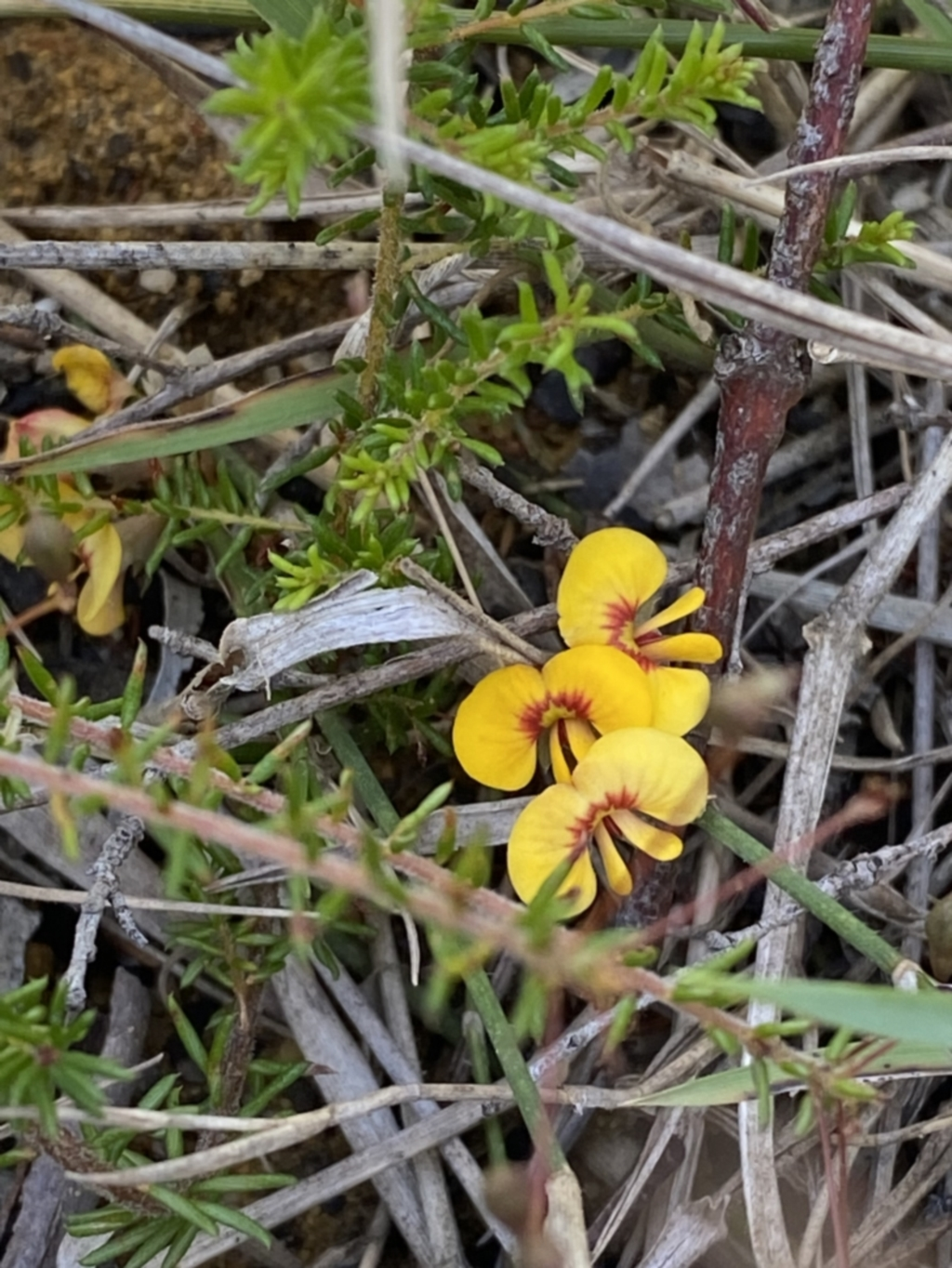

Scientific classification
- Kingdom: Plantae
- Clade: Embryophytes
- Clade: Tracheophytes
- Clade: Spermatophytes
- Clade: Angiosperms
- Clade: Eudicots
- Clade: Rosids
- Order: Fabales
- Family: Fabaceae
- Subfamily: Faboideae
- Genus: Dillwynia
- Species: D. parvifolia

Binomial name
- Dillwynia parvifolia R.Br. ex Sims

= Dillwynia parvifolia =

Species of flowering plant

Dillwynia parvifolia commonly known as small-leaved dillwynia, is a species of flowering plant in the family Fabaceae and is endemic to New South Wales. It is a spreading to erect shrub with twisted, narrow oblong leaves and yellow flowers with red markings.

== Description ==
Dillwynia parvifolia is a spreading to erect shrub that typically grows to a height of 0.3–1.0 m (1 ft 0 in – 3 ft 3 in) and has tiny hairs on the stems. The leaves are twisted, narrow oblong, 1.5–4 mm (0.059–0.157 in) long and glabrous. The flowers are arranged in umbels of up to six on a peduncle up to 3 mm (0.12 in) long with bracts and bracteoles 0.5–1.0 mm (0.020–0.039 in) long. The sepals are 3.5–4.0 mm (0.14–0.16 in) long and glabrous and the standard petal is 5–7 mm (0.20–0.28 in) long and yellow with red markings. The fruit is a pod 3–5 mm (0.12–0.20 in) long.

== Taxonomy and naming ==
Dillwynia parvifolia was first formally described in 1812 by John Sims in the Botanical Magazine from an unpublished description by Robert Brown. The specific epithet (parvifolia) means "small-leaved".

== Distribution and habitat ==
This dillwynia grows in forest on the coast and tablelands from the Cumberland Plain to the Clyde River.
