= Dillwynia palustris =

Scientific classification
- Kingdom: Plantae
- Clade: Tracheophytes
- Clade: Angiosperms
- Clade: Eudicots
- Clade: Rosids
- Order: Fabales
- Family: Fabaceae
- Subfamily: Faboideae
- Genus: Dillwynia
- Species: D. palustris

Binomial name
- Dillwynia palustris Jobson & P.H.Weston

Species of flowering plant

Dillwynia palustris is a species of flowering plant in the family Fabaceae and is endemic to the Snowy Mountains in New South Wales. It is a weakly ascending to low-lying shrub with glabrous stems, linear, spirally twisted leaves and orange or yellow flowers with red markings.

== Description ==
Dillwynia palustris is a weakly ascending to low-lying shrub that typically grows to a height of 10–50 cm (3.9–19.7 in) and sometimes forms mats, the stems and leaves usually glabrous. The leaves are linear, sometimes triangular in cross-section, 2.5–6 mm (0.098–0.236 in) long with a short point on the end. The flowers are arranged in umbels singly or in groups of up to three on a peduncle 11–28 mm (0.43–1.10 in) long with bracts and bracteoles 0.75–1.25 mm (0.030–0.049 in) long. The sepals are 3.5–4.5 mm (0.14–0.18 in) long and glabrous and the standard petal is 5.5–7.5 mm (0.22–0.30 in) long and orange to yellow with red markings. Flowering occurs in January and early February and the fruit is an oval pod 4.5–5.5 mm (0.18–0.22 in) long.

== Taxonomy and naming ==
Dillwynia palustris was first formally described in 1999 by Peter C. Jobson and Peter H. Weston in the journal Telopea from specimens they collected near Tumbarumba in 1998. The specific epithet (palustris) means "marshy", referring to the preferred habitat of this species.

== Distribution and habitat ==
This dillwynia grows in the ecotone between open woodland with a grassy understorey and swamps with permanent water. It is only known from three areas near the Tumut River catchment, near Talbingo and near Brindabella.
