= Dillwynia juniperina =

Prickly parrotpea

Scientific classification
- Kingdom: Plantae
- Clade: Tracheophytes
- Clade: Angiosperms
- Clade: Eudicots
- Clade: Rosids
- Order: Fabales
- Family: Fabaceae
- Subfamily: Faboideae
- Genus: Dillwynia
- Species: D. juniperina

Binomial name
- Dillwynia juniperina Lodd., G.Lodd. & W.Lodd.

Synonyms
- Dillwynia juniperina Sieber ex Benth. nom. illeg.; Dillwynia juniperina Sieber ex Benth. isonym

Species of flowering plant

Dillwynia juniperina, commonly known as prickly parrotpea, is a species of flowering plant in the family Fabaceae and is endemic to south-eastern continental Australia. It is an erect, spreading shrub with rigid, linear, sharply-pointed leaves and yellow flowers with red markings.

== Description ==
Dillwynia juniperina is an erect, spreading shrub that typically grows to a height of 1–2 m (3 ft 3 in – 6 ft 7 in) with hairy stems. The leaves are rigid, linear, triangular in cross-section, 6–18 mm (0.24–0.71 in) long and sessile with a sharply-pointed tip. The flowers are arranged in racemes up to 45 mm (1.8 in) long in up to ten leaf axils near the ends of branchlets, with hairy bracts and bracteoles about 1 mm (0.039 in) long. The sepals are hairy, 3–5 mm (0.12–0.20 in) long and joined at the base, the standard petal is yellow, 5.5–9 mm (0.22–0.35 in) long and the keel is red. Flowering occurs from August to November and the fruit is an oval pod 5–6 mm (0.20–0.24 in) long.

== Taxonomy and naming ==
Dillwynia juniperina was first formally described in 1825 by Conrad, George and William Loddiges in The Botanical Cabinet. The specific epithet (juniperina) means "juniper-like".

== Distribution ==
This dillwynia grows in scattered locations in drier forest and woodland along the coast, tablelands and western slopes of New South Wales and north-central and eastern Victoria.
