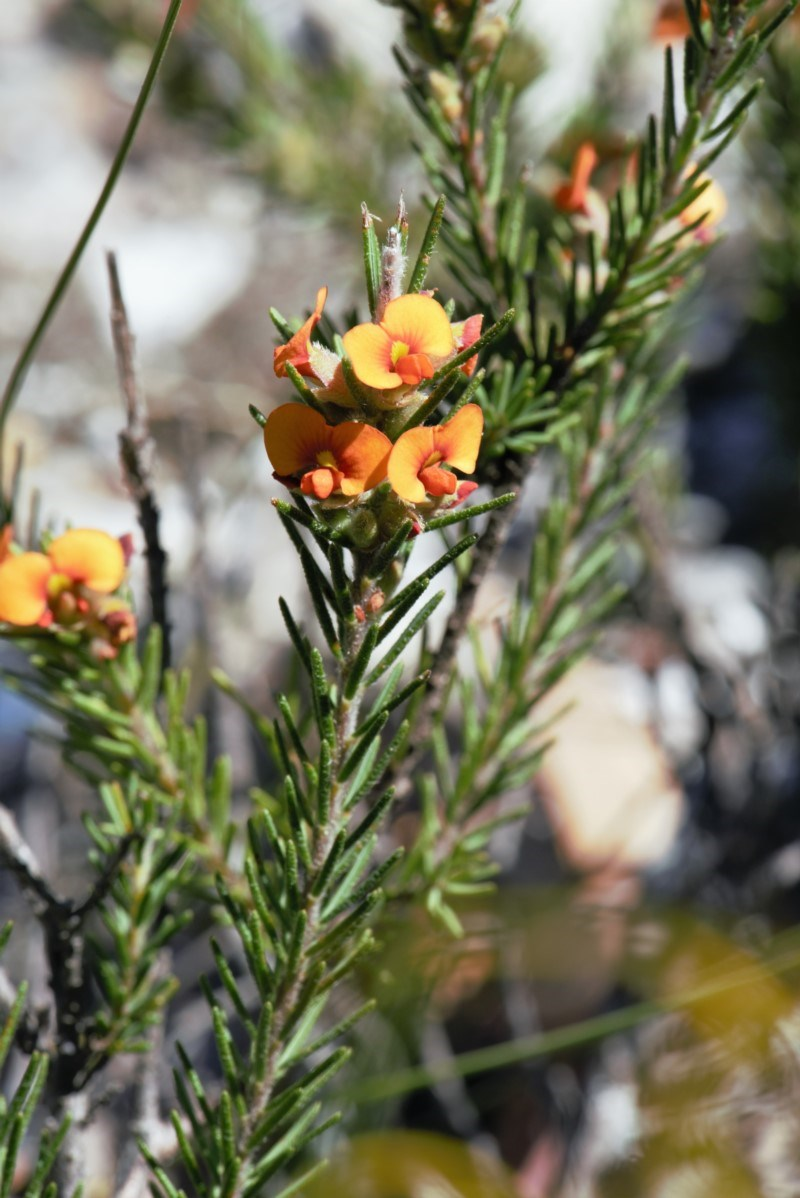
- In Booderee National Park

Scientific classification
- Kingdom: Plantae
- Clade: Tracheophytes
- Clade: Angiosperms
- Clade: Eudicots
- Clade: Rosids
- Order: Fabales
- Family: Fabaceae
- Subfamily: Faboideae
- Genus: Dillwynia
- Species: D. brunioides

Binomial name
- Dillwynia brunioides Meisn.

Synonyms
- Pultenaea brunioides (Meisn.) Joy Thomps.

= Dillwynia brunioides =

Sandstone parrot-pea

Species of flowering plant

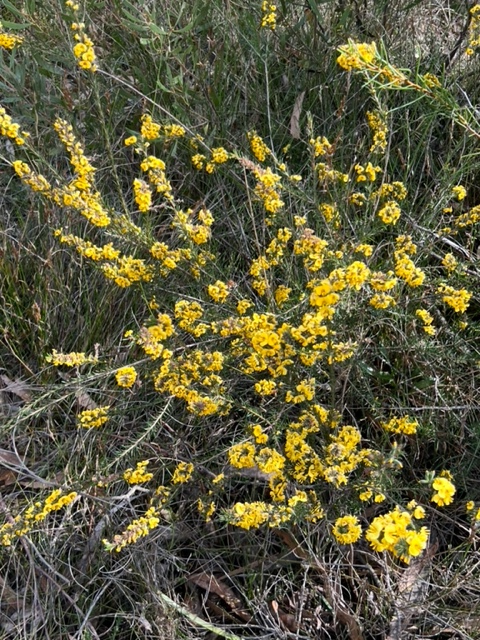
Habit

Dillwynia brunioides, commonly known as sandstone parrot-pea, is a species of flowering plant in the family Fabaceae and is endemic to New South Wales. It is an erect shrub with silky-hairy stems, linear, grooved leaves and yellow flowers with red markings.

== Description ==
Dillwynia brunioides is an erect shrub that typically grows to a height of 0.3–1 m (1 ft 0 in – 3 ft 3 in) with silky-hairy stems. The leaves are arranged alternately at angles to the stem, linear, more or less triangular in cross-section, 5–15 mm (0.20–0.59 in) long with a longitudinal groove on the upper surface and minutely pimply. The flowers are arranged in heads of up to nine flowers on the ends of branchlets with bracts and bracteoles about 4 mm (0.16 in) long. The sepals are hairy, 5–6 mm (0.20–0.24 in) long and joined at the base. The standard petal is 8–10 mm (0.31–0.39 in) long and the keel is yellow with red markings.

== Taxonomy and naming ==
Dillwynia brunioides was first formally described in 1844 by Carl Meissner in Lehmann's Plantae Preissianae.

== Distribution ==
This dillwynia grows in forest and heath on sandstone on the coast and ranges between the Blue Mountains, the Budawangs and Jervis Bay in eastern New South Wales.
