= Dillwynia divaricata =

Scientific classification
- Kingdom: Plantae
- Clade: Tracheophytes
- Clade: Angiosperms
- Clade: Eudicots
- Clade: Rosids
- Order: Fabales
- Family: Fabaceae
- Subfamily: Faboideae
- Genus: Dillwynia
- Species: D. divaricata

Binomial name
- Dillwynia divaricata (Turcz.) Benth.

Species of flowering plant

Dillwynia divaricata is a species of flowering plant in the family Fabaceae and is endemic to the south-west of Western Australia. It is an erect, spindly shrub with cylindrical, grooved leaves and yellow flowers with brownish markings.

== Description ==
Dillwynia divaricata is an erect, spindly shrub with glabrous branches but hairy leaves 6–15 mm (0.24–0.59 in) long and 0.8–1 mm (0.031–0.039 in) wide. The flowers are sessile or on a hairy pedicel up to 0.5 mm (0.020 in) long with hairy bracteoles about 3 mm (0.12 in) long, but that fall off as the flower opens. The sepals are also hairy, 5–7 mm (0.20–0.28 in) long and the corolla mostly yellow with brownish spots and blotches. The standard petal is 7–9.6 mm (0.28–0.38 in) long, the wings 6.6–7.5 mm (0.26–0.30 in) long and the keel 5–7 mm (0.20–0.28 in) long. Flowering mainly occurs from February to May.

== Taxonomy and naming ==
This species was first formally described in 1853 by Nikolai Turczaninow in the Bulletin de la Société Impériale des Naturalistes de Moscou and was given the name Eutaxia divaricata. In 1864, George Bentham changed the name to Dillwynia divaricata in Flora Australiensis.

== Distribution ==
Dillwynia divaricata grows in sandy soil on flat areas in the Avon Wheatbelt, Coolgardie, Esperance Plains and Mallee biogeographic regions of south-western Western Australia.

== Conservation status ==
This species is classified as "not threatened" by the Government of Western Australia Department of Parks and Wildlife.
