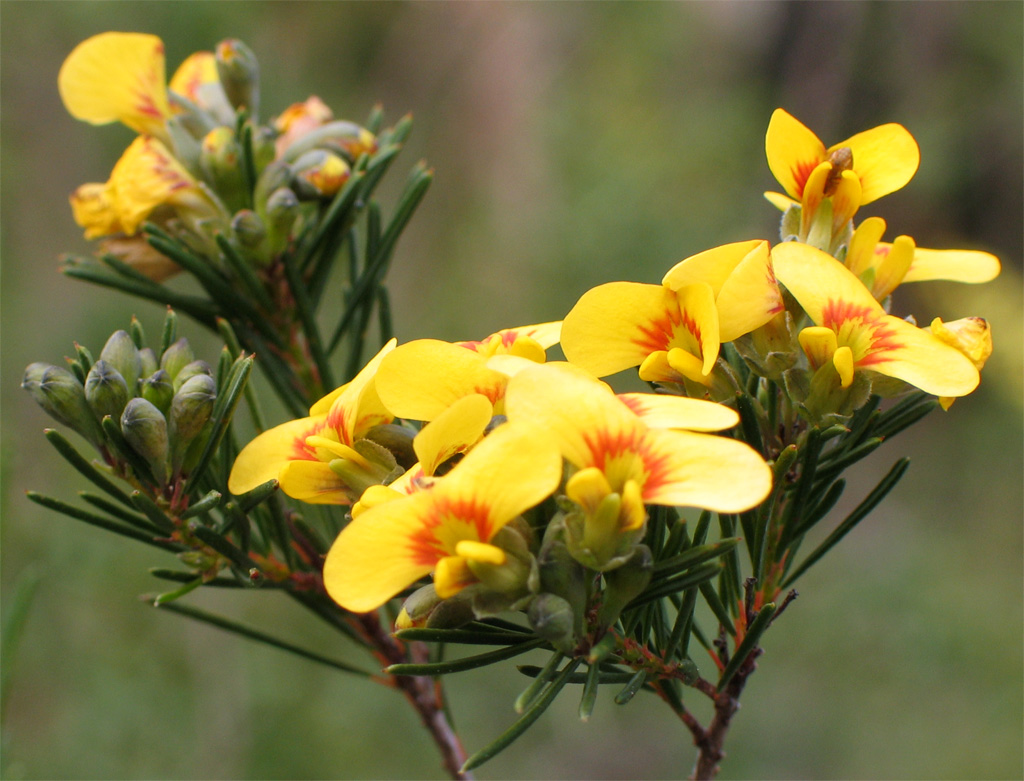
- Dillwynia glaberrima in Freycinet National Park

Scientific classification
- Kingdom: Plantae
- Clade: Embryophytes
- Clade: Tracheophytes
- Clade: Spermatophytes
- Clade: Angiosperms
- Clade: Eudicots
- Clade: Rosids
- Order: Fabales
- Family: Fabaceae
- Subfamily: Faboideae
- Genus: Dillwynia
- Species: D. glaberrima

Binomial name
- Dillwynia glaberrima Sm.

Synonyms
- Dillwynia glaberrima Labill. [nom. illeg.]; Dillwynia ericifolia var. glaberrima (Sm.) Benth.; Dillwynia glaberrima var. longipes Blakely; Dillwynia glaberrima var. pubescens Blakely

= Dillwynia glaberrima =

Smooth parrot-pea

Species of plant

Dillwynia glaberrima commonly known as the smooth parrot-pea, is an Australian flowering plant in the family Fabaceae. It is a small upright shrub with linear leaves and clusters of yellow flowers.

== Description ==
This species is a spreading or erect shrub to 2 metres in height with cylindrical leaves to 2.5 cm long, with a short, often recurved apex. The bright yellow pea flowers have red markings and are proportionately quite wide. These appear in dense clusters at the end of the wiry branchlets from August to December (late winter to early summer) in its native range. It bears 4−6mm long pods with sparse hairs.

== Taxonomy ==
The species was first formally described by English botanist James Edward Smith in Annals of Botany in 1805. The type was collected in Port Jackson.

== Distribution ==
Dillwynia glaberrima occurs in woodland, open forest, heathy forest and heathland in Queensland, New South Wales, Victoria, Tasmania and South Australia. It is widespread in coastal areas.

== Cultivation ==
The species requires light shade and good drainage.
