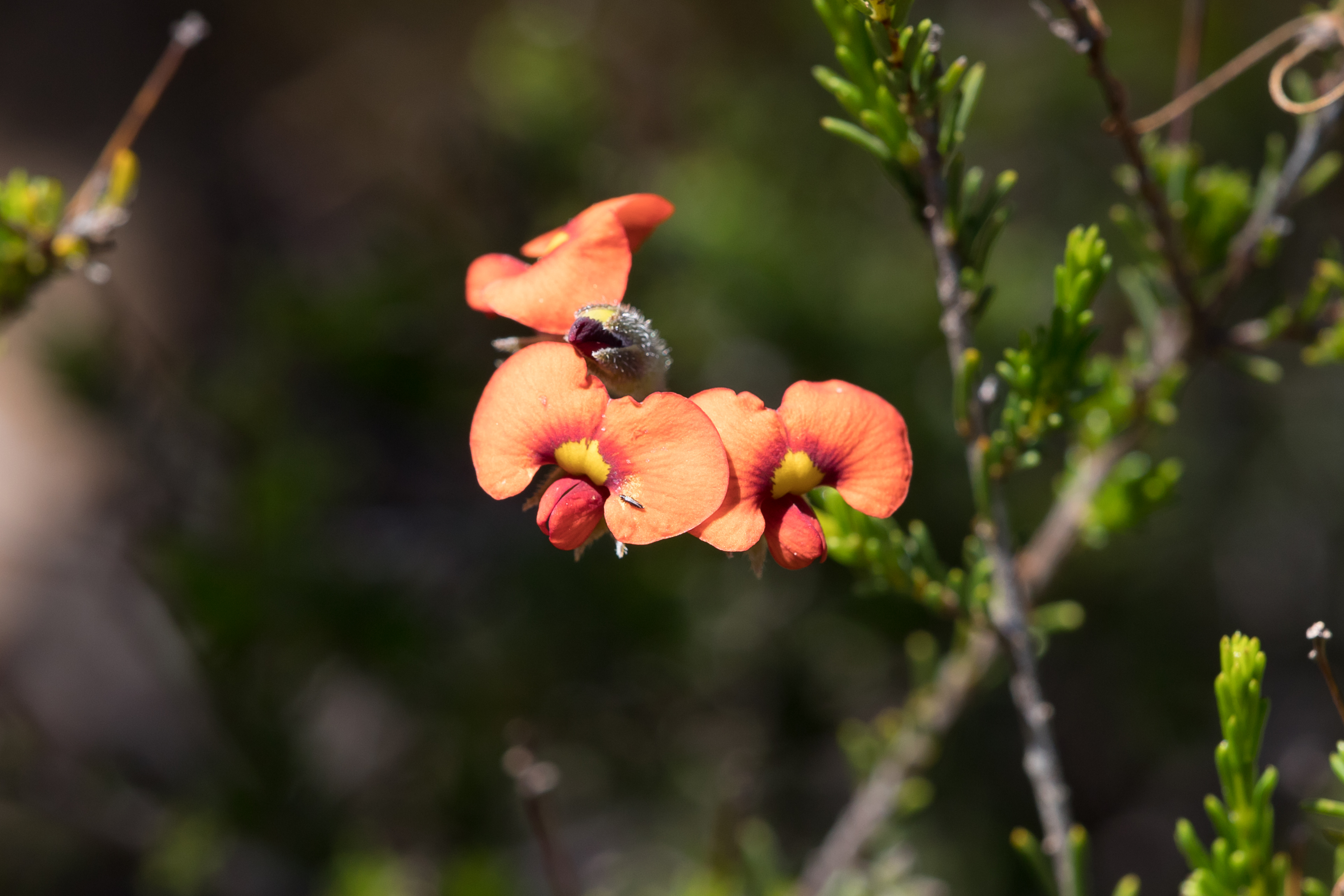
- In Kyeema Conservation Park

Scientific classification
- Kingdom: Plantae
- Clade: Tracheophytes
- Clade: Angiosperms
- Clade: Eudicots
- Clade: Rosids
- Order: Fabales
- Family: Fabaceae
- Subfamily: Faboideae
- Genus: Dillwynia
- Species: D. hispida

Binomial name
- Dillwynia hispida Lindl.

Synonyms
- List: Dillwynia hispida var. glabriflora Blakely; Dillwynia hispida var. glabrifolia A.D.Chapm. orth. var.; Dillwynia hispida var. glabripes Blakely; Dillwynia hispida Lindl. var. hispida; Dillwynia hispida var. laevifolia Blakely; Dillwynia hispida var. laevigata Joy Thomps. orth. var.; Dillwynia scabra Schltdl.

= Dillwynia hispida =

Red parrot-pea

Species of legume

Dillwynia hispida , commonly known as red parrot-pea, is a species of flowering plant in the family Fabaceae and is endemic to south-eastern Australia. It is an erect shrub with more or less glabrous stems, linear to thread-like leaves and orange and red, partly crimson flowers.

== Description ==
Dillwynia hispida is an erect shrub that typically grows to a height of up to 60 cm (24 in) and has more or less glabrous stems. The leaves are linear to thread-like with the edges turned downwards, mostly 3–10 mm (0.12–0.39 in) long and usually covered with stiff hairs. The flowers are arranged in groups of up to nine on the ends of branchlets on a peduncle up to 40 mm (1.6 in) long, each flower on a pedicel 0.5–3 mm (0.020–0.118 in) long with bracts and bracteoles 1–3 mm (0.039–0.118 in) long. The sepals are 5–8 mm (0.20–0.31 in) long and usually hairy on the outside. The standard petal is 7–12 mm (0.28–0.47 in) long, orange and red and the keel usually protrudes from the red to crimson wings. The fruit is an oval to more or less spherical pod about 4 mm (0.16 in) long.

== Taxonomy ==
Dillwynia hispida was first formally described in 1838 by John Lindley in Thomas Mitchell's journal, Three Expeditions into the interior of Eastern Australia. The specific epithet (hispida) means "with rough, bristly hairs".

== Distribution and habitat ==
This dillwynia mainly grows in heath, woodland, forest and mallee scrubland in western Victoria, southern inland New South, and south-eastern South Australia.
