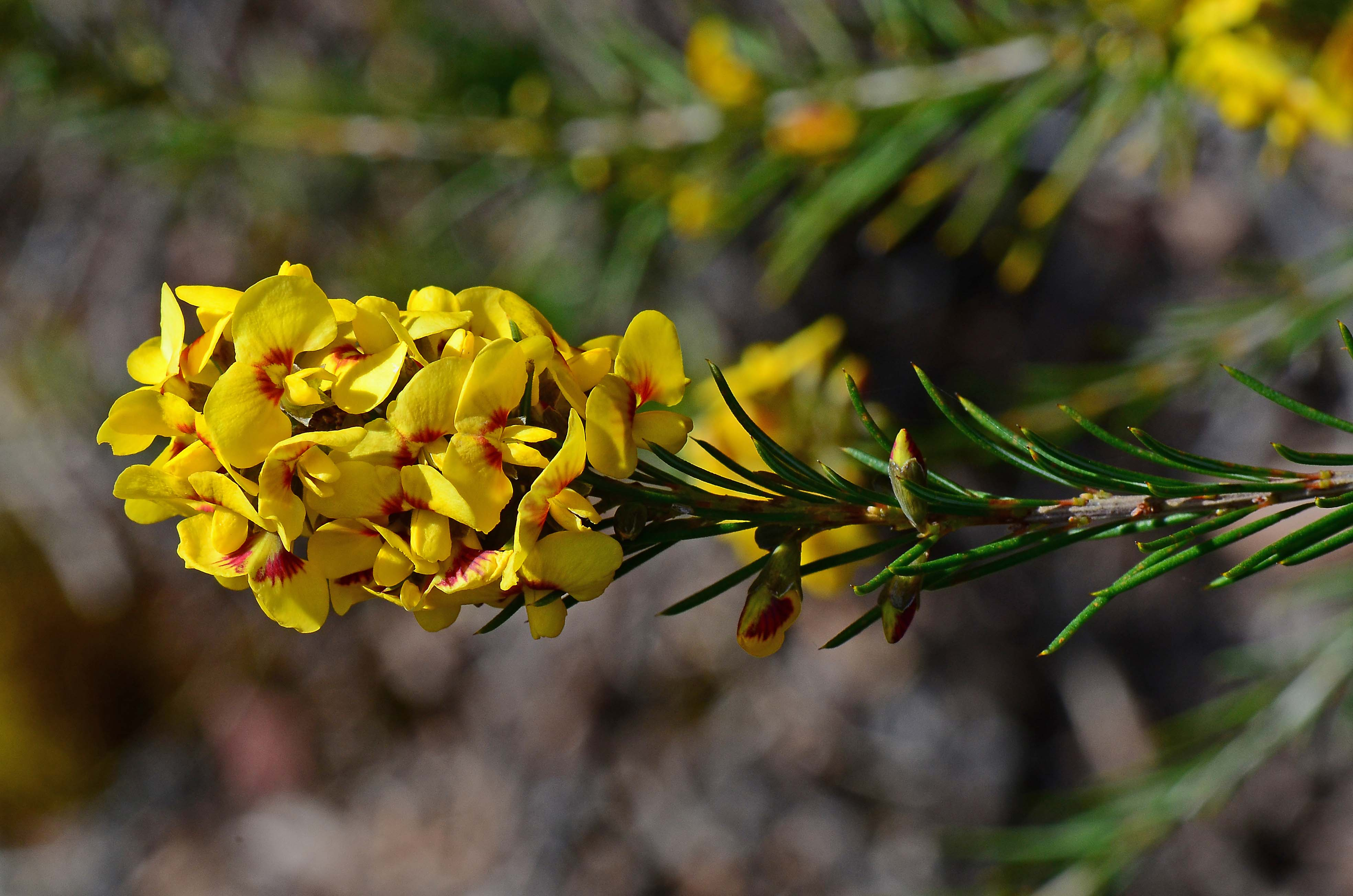
- On Mount William in the Grampians National Park

Scientific classification
- Kingdom: Plantae
- Clade: Tracheophytes
- Clade: Angiosperms
- Clade: Eudicots
- Clade: Rosids
- Order: Fabales
- Family: Fabaceae
- Subfamily: Faboideae
- Genus: Dillwynia
- Species: D. oreodoxa

Binomial name
- Dillwynia oreodoxa Blakely

= Dillwynia oreodoxa =

Species of flowering plant

Dillwynia oreodoxa is a species of flowering plant in the family Fabaceae and is endemic to Victoria, Australia. It is an erect shrub with glabrous foliage, linear leaves and yellow flowers with red markings.

== Description ==
Dillwynia oreodoxa is an erect shrub that typically grows to a height of up to 4 m (13 ft) with glabrous stems and leaves. The leaves are linear, triangular in cross-section, 10–30 mm (0.39–1.18 in) long and 0.7–1.0 mm (0.028–0.039 in) wide. The flowers are arranged on the ends of branchlets in groups of up to six, each flower on a pedicel up to 5 mm (0.20 in) long. The sepals are 5–6 mm (0.20–0.24 in) long, the standard petal about 11 mm (0.43 in) long, and yellow with red veins near the base, the wings about the same length as the standard, and the keel shorter and hooded. Flowering occurs from October to January and the fruit is a pod 5–7 mm (0.20–0.28 in) long and about 4 mm (0.16 in) wide.

== Taxonomy and naming ==
Dillwynia oreodoxa was first formally described in 1939 by William Blakely in The Australian Naturalist. The specific epithet (oreodoxa) is from Greek words meaning "pertaining to mountains" and "glory".

== Distribution ==
This goodenia grows on rocky hillsides in woodland and forest in the Grampians National Park, south-western Victoria.
