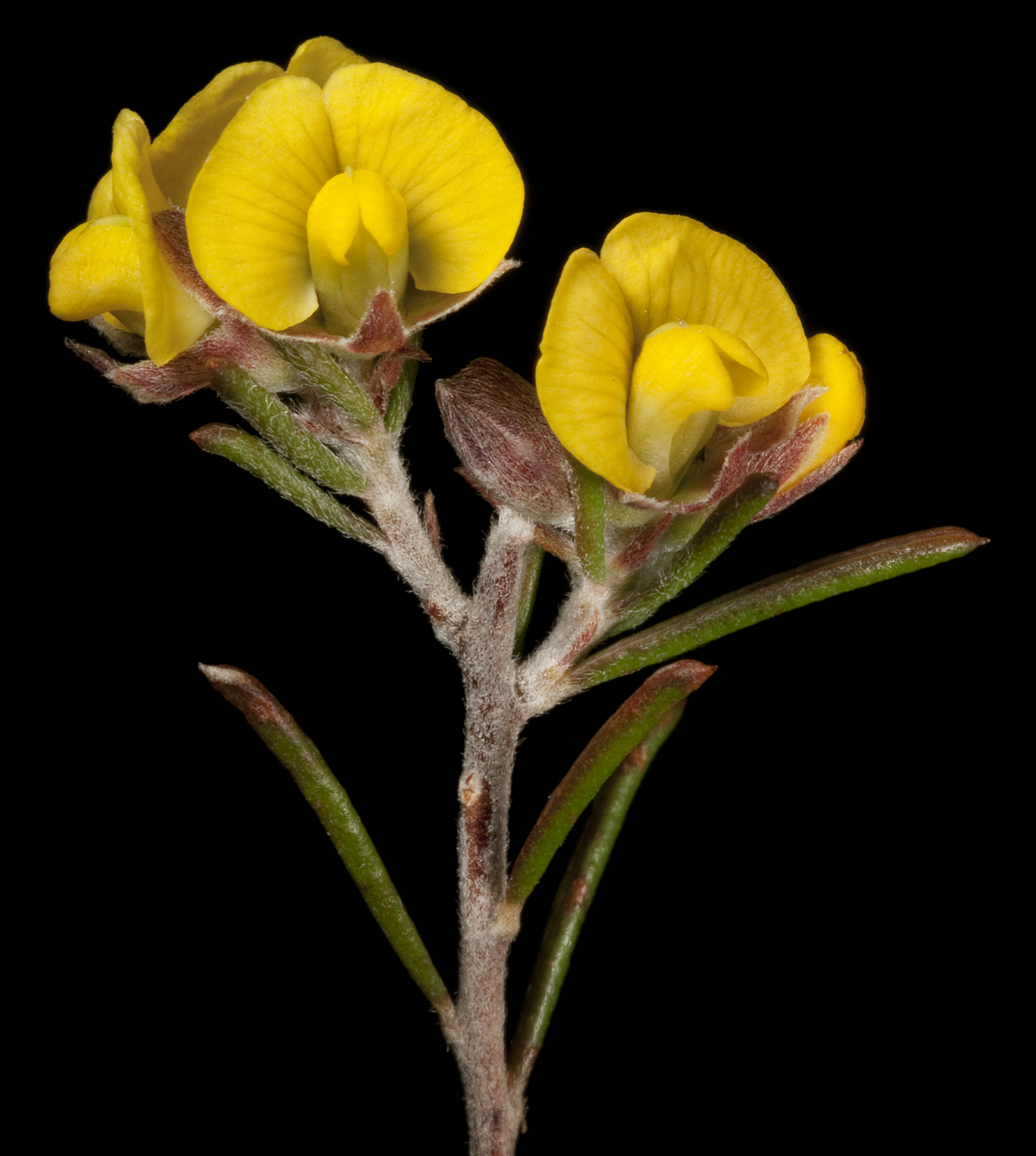

Scientific classification
- Kingdom: Plantae
- Clade: Tracheophytes
- Clade: Angiosperms
- Clade: Eudicots
- Clade: Rosids
- Order: Fabales
- Family: Fabaceae
- Subfamily: Faboideae
- Genus: Dillwynia
- Species: D. acerosa

Binomial name
- Dillwynia acerosa S.Moore

= Dillwynia acerosa =

Species of flowering plant

Dillwynia acerosa is a species of flowering plant in the family Fabaceae and is endemic to Western Australia. It is an erect spindly shrub with hairy, needle-shaped leaves and yellow flowers.

== Description ==
Dillwynia acerosa is an erect, spindly shrub that typically grows to a height of up to 50 cm (20 in) with hairy stems that are round in cross-section. The leaves or phylloclades are arranged alternately, needle-shaped, 3–9 mm (0.12–0.35 in) long and 0.5–1 mm (0.020–0.039 in) wide. The flowers are arranged on the ends of branchlets, each flower on a hairy pedicel 1–2.5 mm (0.039–0.098 in) long with hairy sepals 5–6 mm (0.20–0.24 in) long. The standard petal is 6.8–10 mm (0.27–0.39 in) long, the wings 6–10 mm (0.24–0.39 in) long and the keel 5–7 mm (0.20–0.28 in) long. There are ten stamens, the style is hairy and 1.2–2 mm (0.047–0.079 in) long. Flowering occurs in September and the fruit is a follicle that is not constricted between the seeds.

== Taxonomy and naming ==
Dillwynia acerosa was first formally described in 1899 by Spencer Le Marchant Moore in Journal of the Linnean Society, Botany. The specific epithet (acerosa) means "needle-shaped", referring to the leaves.

== Distribution ==
This goodenia grows gravelly clay in the Coolgardie, Esperance Plains, Jarrah Forest, Mallee, Murchison and Nullarbor biogeographic regions of Western Australia.

== Conservation status ==
Dillwynia acerosa is classified as "not threatened" by the Government of Western Australia Department of Parks and Wildlife.
