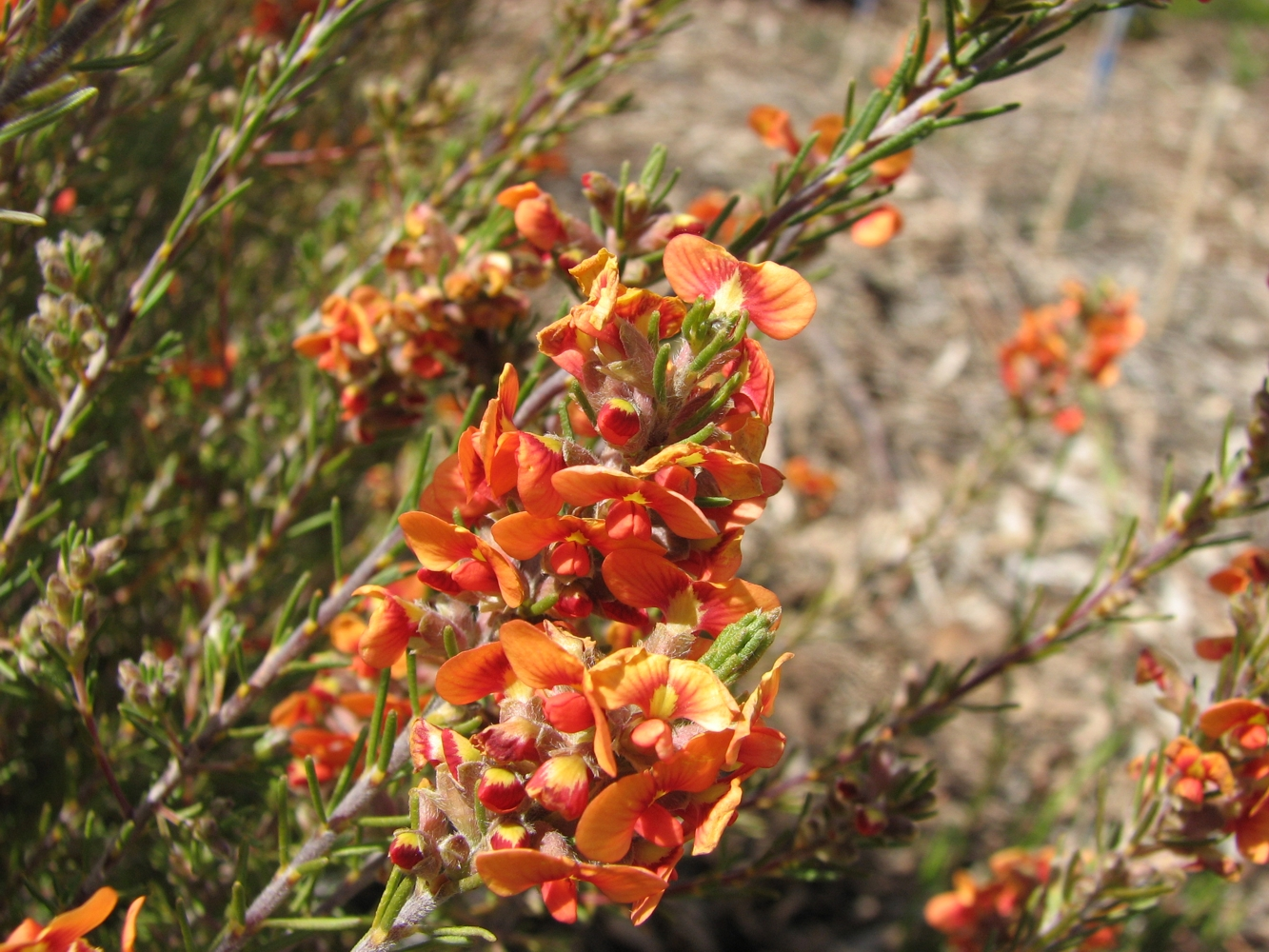
- Dillwynia cinerascens in Royal Botanic Gardens, Cranbourne

Scientific classification
- Kingdom: Plantae
- Clade: Tracheophytes
- Clade: Angiosperms
- Clade: Eudicots
- Clade: Rosids
- Order: Fabales
- Family: Fabaceae
- Subfamily: Faboideae
- Genus: Dillwynia
- Species: D. cinerascens

Binomial name
- Dillwynia cinerascens R.Br.

= Dillwynia cinerascens =

Grey parrot-pea

Species of plant

Dillwynia cinerascens, commonly known as grey parrot-pea, is a species of flowering plant in the family Fabaceae and is endemic to south-eastern Australia. It is an erect to low-lying shrub with linear or thread-like leaves and orange or yellow flowers.

== Description ==
Dillwynia cinerascens is a low-lying to erect, heath-like shrub that grows to a height of 0.3–1.5 m (1 ft 0 in – 4 ft 11 in) with hairs flattened against its stems. The leaves are linear to thread-like, 5–20 mm (0.20–0.79 in) long and 0.3–0.5 mm (0.012–0.020 in) wide, sometimes with a few white hairs. The flowers are mostly orange or yellow and arranged in short racemes or corymbs, usually on the ends of branchlets, each flower sessile or on a short peduncle. There are hairy bracts about 1 mm (0.039 in) long and the sepals are about 4 mm (0.16 in) long. The standard petal is 5–8 mm (0.20–0.31 in) long, the wings shorter and the keel shortest. Flowering occurs from September to December and the fruit is an egg-shaped pod 3–5 mm (0.12–0.20 in) long and 1.5 mm (0.059 in) wide containing smooth seeds.

== Taxonomy ==
Dillwynia cinerascens was first formally described by botanist Robert Brown in the Botanical Magazine in 1821. Brown came across the plant in 1804 growing near the River Derwent in Tasmania. The specific epithet (cinerascens) means "becoming ash-grey".

== Distribution ==
Grey parrot-pea grows in dry forest and woodland and is widespread in Victoria but also occurring in New South Wales south from near Bathurst, in Tasmania and in the far south-east of South Australia.
