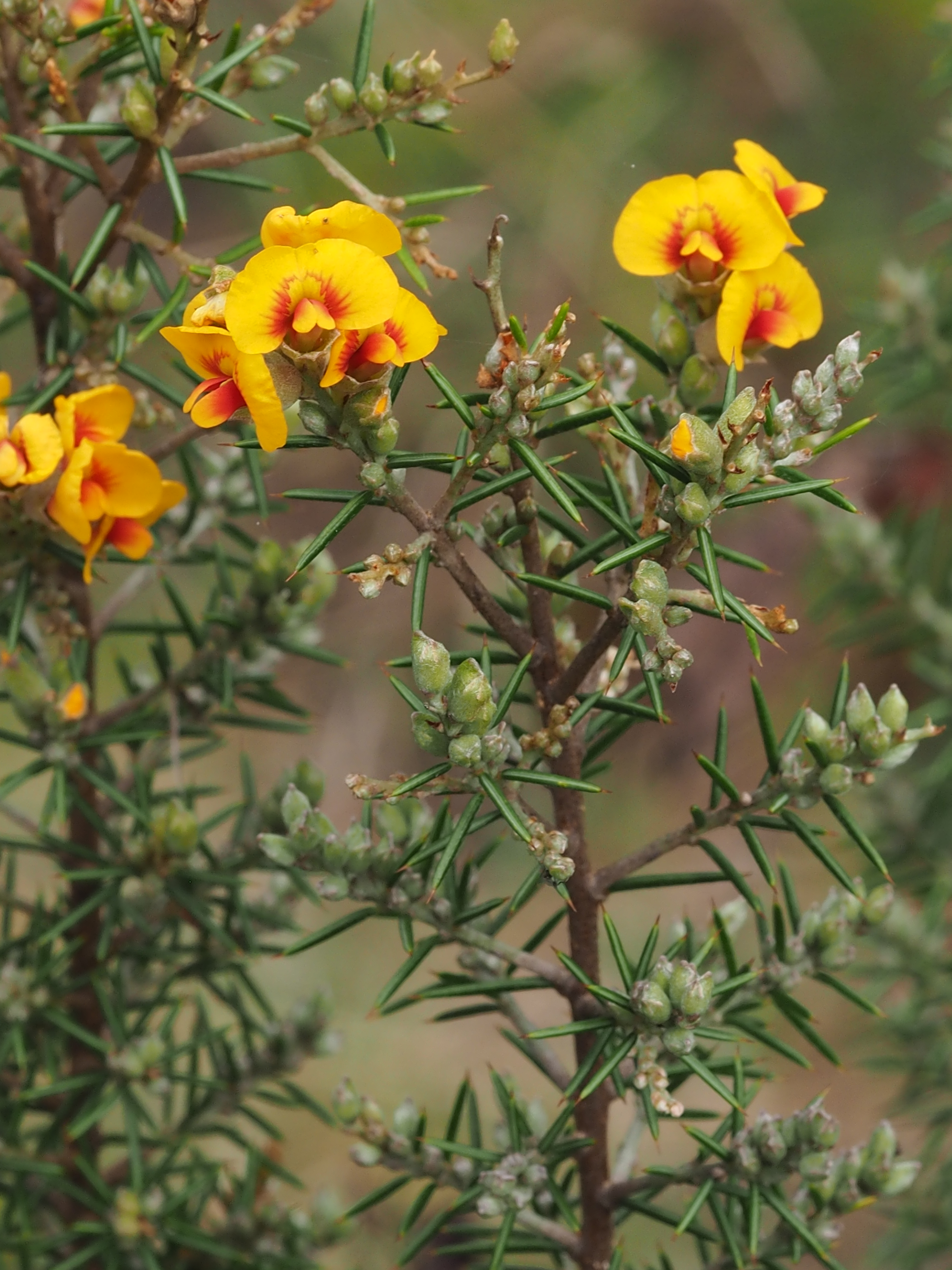
- Dillwynia sieberi in the Oxley Wild Rivers National Park

Scientific classification
- Kingdom: Plantae
- Clade: Tracheophytes
- Clade: Angiosperms
- Clade: Eudicots
- Clade: Rosids
- Order: Fabales
- Family: Fabaceae
- Subfamily: Faboideae
- Genus: Dillwynia
- Species: D. sieberi

Binomial name
- Dillwynia sieberi Steud.

= Dillwynia sieberi =

Sieber's parrot-pea

Species of flowering plant

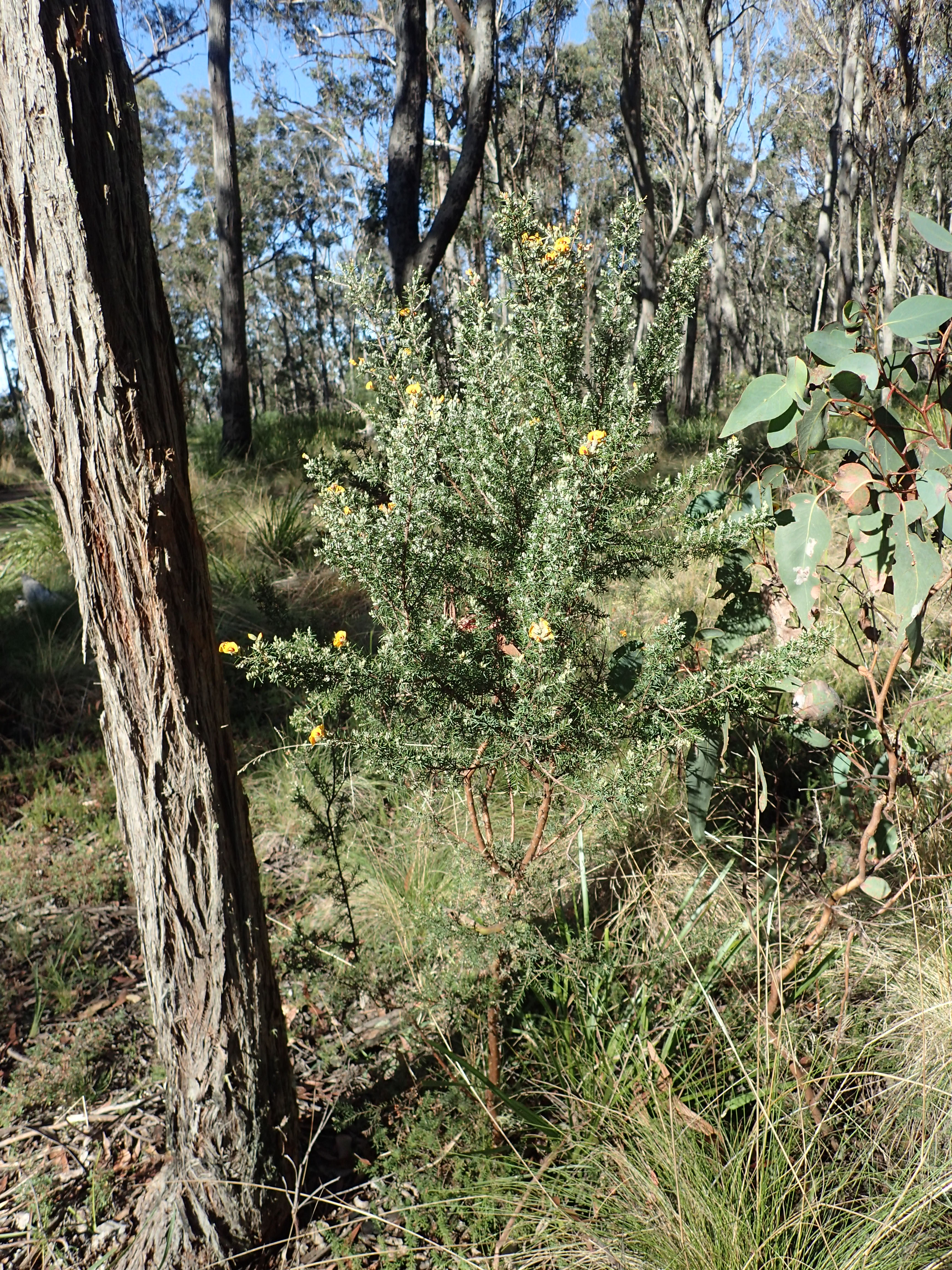
Habit

Dillwynia sieberi, commonly known as Sieber's parrot-pea, is a species of flowering plant in the family Fabaceae and is endemic to eastern Australia. It is an erect shrub with rigid, needle-shaped, sharply-pointed leaves and yellow to yellow-orange flowers with reddish-brown markings.

== Description ==
Dillwynia sieberi is an erect shrub that typically grows to a height of 1–2 m (3 ft 3 in – 6 ft 7 in) with flattened hairs on the stems. The leaves are linear, needle-shaped and sharply-pointed, 7–20 mm (0.28–0.79 in) long and less than 1 mm (0.039 in) wide. The flowers are arranged in racemes in up to ten leaf axils near the ends of branchlets, each flower on a pedicel about 3 mm (0.12 in) long. There are bracts and bracteoles about 1 mm (0.039 in) long. The sepals are 3–5 mm (0.12–0.20 in) long and joined at the base, the upper lobes joined in a broad "lip". The flowers are yellow to yellow-orange with reddish-brown markings, the standard petal 5.5–9 mm (0.22–0.35 in) long. The wings are 5–9.2 mm (0.20–0.36 in) long and the keel 4.5–6 mm (0.18–0.24 in) long. Flowering occurs from April to November and the fruit is an oval pod 5–6 mm (0.20–0.24 in) long with the remains of the petals attached.

== Taxonomy and naming ==
Dillwynia sieberi was first formally described in 1840 by Ernst Gottlieb von Steudel in his book Nomenclator Botanicus. The specific epithet (sieberi) honours Franz Sieber.

== Distribution ==
Sieber's parrot-pea grows in forest and woodland and is widespread along the ranges and western slopes of New South Wales and the Australian Capital Territory, and in coastal areas between Newcastle and Nowra. It also occurs in south-eastern Queensland and a few places in south-eastern Victoria.
