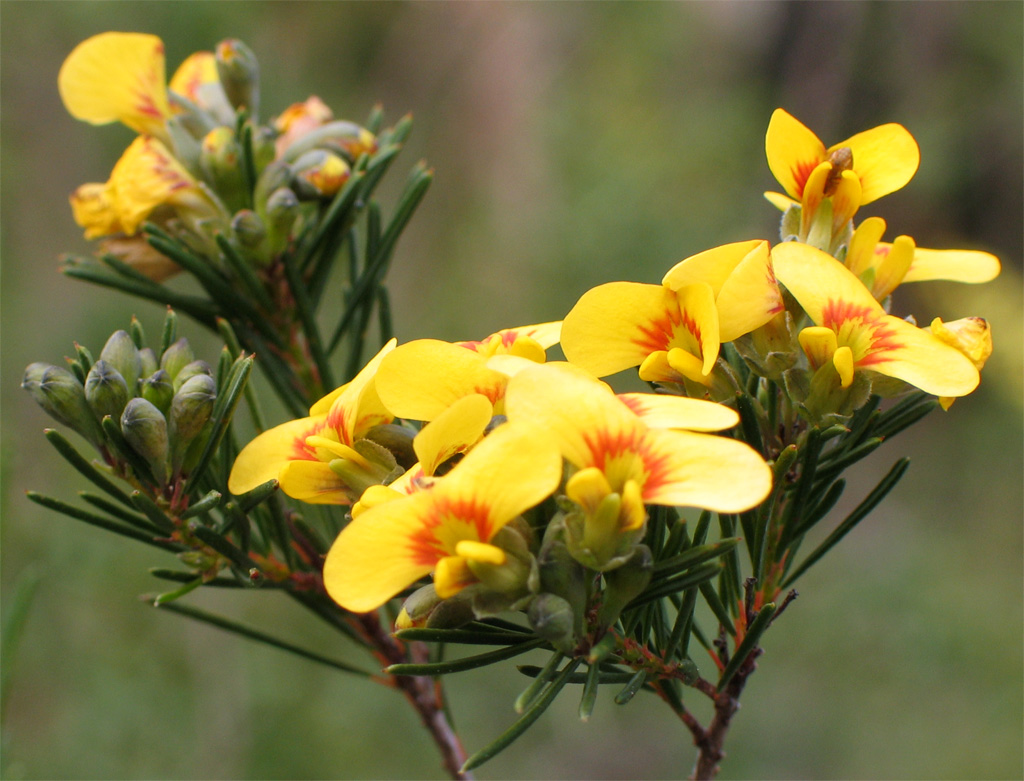
- Dillwynia glaberrima

Scientific classification
- Kingdom: Plantae
- Clade: Embryophytes
- Clade: Tracheophytes
- Clade: Spermatophytes
- Clade: Angiosperms
- Clade: Eudicots
- Clade: Rosids
- Order: Fabales
- Family: Fabaceae
- Subfamily: Faboideae
- Clade: Mirbelioids
- Genus: Dillwynia; Sm.

Species
- See text.

Synonyms
- Xeropetalum Rchb. (1828), not validly publ.

= Dillwynia =

Genus of legumes

Dillwynia is a genus of about 20 species of flowering plants in the family Fabaceae, and is endemic to Australia. Plants in this genus are shrubs with simple leaves and yellow or red and yellow flowers similar to others in the family.

== Description ==
Plants in the genus Dillwynia are shrubs with simple leaves that are linear, needle-shaped leaves with a groove along the upper surface or triangular in cross-section. The flowers are yellow or red and yellow and usually arranged singly or in small groups in leaf axils or on the ends of branchlets. The upper two of five sepal lobes are joined in a single "lip", the standard petal is broader than long, and the keel is no longer than the wings. The stamens are free from each other, the ovary is on a short stalk and the fruit is a more or less sessile pod.

== Taxonomy ==
The genus Dillwynia was first formally described in 1805 by James Edward Smith in Annals of Botany. The name Dillwynia honours Lewis Weston Dillwyn "whose scientific labours respecting the genus Conferva, as well as his knowledge in other abstruse parts of botany, merit such a memorial".

=== Species list ===
The following is a list of Dillwynia species accepted by the Australian Plant Census as of May 2021 and Plants of the World Online as of August 2023:

- Dillwynia acerosa S.Moore (W.A.)
- Dillwynia acicularis DC. (N.S.W.)
- Dillwynia brunioides Meisn. – sandstone parrot-pea (N.S.W.)
- Dillwynia cinerascens R.Br. — grey parrot-pea (S.A., N.S.W., Vic., Tas.)
- Dillwynia crispii Jobson & P.H.Weston (N.S.W.)
- Dillwynia dillwynioides (Meisn.) Druce (W.A.)
- Dillwynia divaricata (Turcz.) Benth. (W.A.)
- Dillwynia elegans Endl. (N.S.W.)
- Dillwynia floribunda Sm. (Qld., N.S.W.)
- Dillwynia glaberrima Sm. — smooth parrot-pea (S.A., Qld., N.S.W., Vic., Tas.)
- Dillwynia glaucula Jobson & P.H.Weston (N.S.W.)
- Dillwynia hispida Lindl. – red parrot-pea (S.A., N.S.W., Vic.)
- Dillwynia juniperina Lodd., G.Lodd. & W.Lodd. – prickly parrotpea (N.S.W., Vic.)
- Dillwynia laxiflora Benth. (W.A.)
- Dillwynia oreodoxa Blakeley – Grampians parrot-pea (Vic.)
- Dillwynia palustris Jobson & P.H.Weston (N.S.W.)
- Dillwynia parvifolia R.Br. ex Sims (N.S.W.)
- Dillwynia phylicoides A.Cunn. – small-leaf parrot-pea (Qld., N.S.W., A.C.T., Vic.)
- Dillwynia prostrata Blakeley — matted parrot-pea (N.S.W., A.C.T., Vic.)
- Dillwynia pungens (Sweet) J.B.Mackay ex Benth. (W.A.)
- Dillwynia ramosissima Benth. – bushy parrot-pea (N.S.W., Vic.)
- Dillwynia retorta (J.C.Wendl.) Druce (Qld., N.S.W.)
- Dillwynia rupestris Jobson & P.H.Weston (N.S.W.)
- Dillwynia sericea A.Cunn. — showy parrot-pea (S.A., Qld., N.S.W., A.C.T., Vic., Tas.)
  - Dillwynia sericea subsp. glabriflora (Blakely) Jobson & P.H.Weston (N.S.W.)
  - Dillwynia sericea subsp. rudis (Sieber ex DC.) Jobson & P.H.Weston (synonym Dillwynia rudis) (N.S.W., S.A., Tas., Vic.)
  - Dillwynia sericea subsp. sericea (N.S.W., Qld., S.A., Tas., Vic.
- Dillwynia sieberi Steud. – Sieber's parrot-pea (Qld., N.S.W., A.C.T., Vic.)
- Dillwynia sparsifolia (F.Muell.) Jobson & P.H.Weston (S.A.)
- Dillwynia stipulifera Blakeley (N.S.W.)
- Dillwynia tenuifolia DC. (N.S.W.)
- Dillwynia trichopoda (Blakely) Jobson & P.H.Weston (Qld., N.S.W.)
- Dillwynia uncinata (Turcz.) J.M.Black – silky parrot-pea (W.A., S.A., Vic.)

== Distribution ==
Species of Dillwynia occur in all Australian states and the Australian Capital Territory, but not the Northern Territory.
