= Buttons (plant) =

Buttons may refer to one of several genera of plants in the family Asteraceae:

- Cotula
- Craspedia
- Leiocarpa
- Leptorhynchos (plant)
- Pycnosorus

== See also ==
- Billy buttons
