= Craspedia blepharia =

Conservation status
- Naturally Uncommon (NZ TCS)

Scientific classification
- Kingdom: Plantae
- Clade: Tracheophytes
- Clade: Angiosperms
- Clade: Eudicots
- Clade: Asterids
- Order: Asterales
- Family: Asteraceae
- Genus: Craspedia
- Species: C. blepharia

Binomial name
- Craspedia blepharia Breitw. & Courtney

Species of flowering plant

Craspedia blepharia, or Garibaldi woollyhead, is a species of Craspedia endemic to New Zealand. It was described in 2024 by New Zealand botanists Ilse Breitwieser and Shannel Courtney and one of its distinguishing characteristics is the long, densely distributed specialised hairs on the rosette leaves. It is known only from Garibaldi Ridge in Kahurangi National Park, Nelson/Tasman, South Island of New Zealand, and is the only vascular plant endemic to this ridge.

== Description ==
Craspedia blepharia is a rhizomatous rosette herb with smooth, fleshy, olive-green leaves 2 – 8 cm long and 1 – 3 cm wide, widest at or above the middle, spatulate, gradually narrowing to a petiole, and with both surfaces and edges sparsely to densely covered with long colourless to brown, curved eyelash-like hairs. Roots are fibrous. The scapes are 7 to 31 cm in length and have 3–7 sessile bracts, and are sparsely covered with longer curly hairs and shorter glandular hairs. The inflorescence is round and contains about 40 captiula and 240 florets. Each floret has a white 5-lobed corolla that is about 3.7 mm long. Anthers are greenish yellow. The feathery pappus has 12–16 white bristles, and achenes are 1.5 – 2.0 mm long and about 1.0 mm wide and hairy.

== Taxonomy ==
Craspedia blepharia is a species of plant in the family Asteraceae. It was described by New Zealand botanists Ilse Breitwieser and Shannel Courtney in 2024.

The type specimen was collected at Garibaldi Ridge in Kahurangi National Park, northwest Nelson, South Island, New Zealand by Breitwieser and others in February 2023, and the holotype specimen is housed at the Allan Herbarium in Lincoln, New Zealand (CHR 668927).

C. blepharia is distinguished from all other species of Craspedia by the distribution and type of hairs on the rosette leaves, which are usually curved like an eyelash and very long (2 to 3 mm long). The species epithet blepharia refers to these eyelash-like hairs.

== Distribution and habitat ==
Craspedia blepharia is currently known from Garibaldi Ridge in Kahurangi National Park, northwest Nelson, South Island, New Zealand. It is the only vascular plant known to be endemic to Garibaldi Ridge. It is found between 1200 and 1400 m above sea level where annual rainfall is very high, and grows on limestone substrate (calcareous rocks and sandstone cliffs).

== Conservation status ==
The species is listed as At Risk - Naturally Uncommon in the most recent assessment (2023) of the New Zealand Threatened Classification for plants, where it was listed as Craspedia (cc) (CHR 358403; Garibaldi Ridge). Its status was unchanged from the 2017 assessment. It also has the qualifier RR ("Range restricted").

ha== External links ==

- Craspedia blepharia , occurrence data from Global Biodiversity Information Facility
