= Blue squill =

Blue squill is a common name for several plants and may refer to:

- Chamaescilla corymbosa
- Craspedia glauca
- Dampiera linearis
- Hyacinthoides non-scripta
- Merwilla plumbea
- Puschkina scilloides libanotica
- Scilla siberica
- Trillium grandiflorum
- Zantedeschia jucunda

Many of these are grown as ornamental plants and it seems likely that blue squill is a particularly popular name among plant breeders. Others are local names from different parts of the world.
