= Craspedia thinicola =

- The Kaitorete spit woollyhead

Conservation status
- Nationally Critical (NZ TCS)

Scientific classification
- Kingdom: Plantae
- Clade: Tracheophytes
- Clade: Angiosperms
- Clade: Eudicots
- Clade: Asterids
- Order: Asterales
- Family: Asteraceae
- Genus: Craspedia
- Species: C. thinicola

Binomial name
- Craspedia thinicola Breitw. & K.A. Ford

Species of flowering plant

Craspedia thinicola, or Kaitorete Spit woollyhead, is a species of Craspedia endemic to New Zealand. It was described in 2022 by New Zealand botanists Ilse Breitwieser and Kerry Ford and one of its distinguishing characteristics is its dark red-purple anthers. It is considered Threatened - Nationally Endangered and is one of only three seed plant species endemic to Kaitorete Spit.

== Description ==
Craspedia thinicola is a small rhizomatous rosette herb with smooth, silver-grey leaves 4 – 8 cm long and 1 – 2 cm wide, widest at or above the middle, suborbicular, elliptic, obovate or oblanceolate, gradually narrowing to a petiole, and with both surfaces and edges densely covered with silver-grey, appressed woolly hairs. Roots are fibrous. The scapes are 3 to 13 cm in length and have 4 sessile bracts, and are moderately covered with wooly hairs. The inflorescence is round and contains about 25 captiula and 130 to 160 florets. Each floret has a white or yellowish-white 5-lobed corolla that is about 5.5 mm long. Anthers are dark red-purple at first, turning pale yellow with dark purple stripes and finally brown after flowering has finished. The feathery pappus has 14–17 white bristles, and achenes are 2.5 – 2.8 mm long and 1.0 – 1.3 mm wide and hairy. The diploid chromosome number is 22.

== Taxonomy ==
Craspedia thinicola is a species of plant in the family Asteraceae. It was described by New Zealand botanists Ilse Breitwieser and Kerry Ford in 2022.

The type specimen was collected at Kaitorete Spit in December 2000 by Breitwieser and Ford, and the holotype specimen is housed at the Allan Herbarium in Lincoln, New Zealand (CHR 640807) Canterbury, New Zealand.

The species epithet thinicola means 'dune dweller' and refers to the habitat of the species.

C. thinicola is one of four species in the genus described in the same article in 2022, together with C. diversicolor, C. argentea and C. rugosa, all of which have dark red-purple anthers and, similar to C. lanata, woolly hairs covering the rosette leaves (lanate). C. thinicola is distinguished from the other species with red-purple anthers by multiple vegetative and reproductive characters including those of the scape, rosette leaves, inflorescences (clusters of flowers), florets (small flowers), achenes (one-seeded fruits), and pappus (the feathery part of the fruit).

== Distribution and habitat ==
Craspedia thinicola is one of only three seed plant species endemic to Kaitorete Spit, Canterbury, Banks Peninsula, South Island, New Zealand. It is found on stable deﬂation hollows with Ficinia spiralis, Hypochaeris radicata, Rumex acetosella, and Raoulia australis. C. thinicola flowers and fruits in November and December.

== Conservation status ==
The species is listed as Threatened - Nationally Endangered in the most recent assessment (2023) of the New Zealand Threatened Classification for plants. Its status was unchanged from the 2017 assessment, where it was listed as Craspedia (c) (CHR 529115; Kaitorete).

In addition to qualifiers CD ("Conservation dependent"), and OL ("One location"), C. thinicola also has the qualifier CI ("Climate impact"). The CI qualifier has been used by the Department of Conservation since 2021 to flag species in its conservation assessments that are "adversely affected by long-term climate trends and/or extreme climatic events."

== Gallery ==
Flowering plant

Close up of leaves with dense covering of wooly hairs

Close up of florets

Large plant past flowering

Habit and habitat
