= Craspedia diversicolor =

Conservation status
- Nationally Critical (NZ TCS)

Scientific classification
- Kingdom: Plantae
- Clade: Tracheophytes
- Clade: Angiosperms
- Clade: Eudicots
- Clade: Asterids
- Order: Asterales
- Family: Asteraceae
- Genus: Craspedia
- Species: C. diversicolor

Binomial name
- Craspedia diversicolor Breitw. & K.A. Ford

Species of flowering plant

Craspedia diversicolor, or woollyhead, is a species of Craspedia endemic to New Zealand. It was described in 2022 by New Zealand botanists Ilse Breitwieser and Kerry Ford and one of its distinguishing characteristics is its dark red-purple anthers. In 2020, there were only two plants remaining in the wild. It is considered Threatened - Nationally Critical, and work is underway to increase the population size and numbers with targeted conservation management.

== Description ==
Craspedia diversicolor is a rhizomatous rosette herb with olive-green, grey or dark red leaves 4.5 – 11 cm long and 1 – 2 cm wide, widest above the middle, gradually narrowing to a petiole, and with both surfaces and edges very thinly covered with silver-grey woolly hairs. Roots are fibrous. The scapes can reach 25 cm in length and have 2–4 sessile bracts, and are sparsely covered with wooly hairs. The inflorescence is round and contains about 60 captiula and 410 florets. Each floret has a white 5-lobed corolla that is about 4 mm long. Anthers are dark red-purple at first, turning pale yellow-green with dark purple stripes and finally brown after flowering has finished. The feathery pappus has 12–14 white bristles, and achenes are 2 – 3 mm long and about 1 mm wide and hairy.

== Taxonomy ==
Craspedia diversicolor is a species of plant in the family Asteraceae. It was described by New Zealand botanists Ilse Breitwieser and Kerry Ford in 2022.

The type specimen was collected in Wakanui Gully, Canterbury, New Zealand in 2001 by Breitwieser and Ford, and the holotype specimen is housed at the Allan Herbarium in Lincoln, New Zealand (CHR 638319).

The species epithet diversicolor refers to the colour variation of the leaves.

C. diversicolor is one of four species in the genus described in the same article in 2022, together with C. thinicola, C. argentea and C. rugosa, all of which have dark red-purple anthers and, similar to C. lanata, woolly hairs covering the rosette leaves (lanate). C. diversicolor is distinguished from the other species with red-purple anthers by multiple vegetative and reproductive characters including those of the scape, rosette leaves, inflorescences (clusters of flowers), florets (small flowers), achenes (one-seeded fruits), and pappus (the feathery part of the fruit).

== Distribution and habitat ==
Craspedia diversicolor is currently known from only one small remaining wild population in Canterbury, South Island, New Zealand. Based on herbarium specimen records, the species' historical distributional range was probably much wider throughout the Canterbury plains. Historical records include Lincoln cemetery (1884), Maronan Road (1918), Hinds River (1965), Bankside Reserve (1969) and Te Pirita (1963), but none of these sites have retained populations of C. diversicolor since then, due to substantial modifications to native dryland habitats in particular for irrigated dairy farming.

== Conservation status ==
In 2019, C. diversicolor comprised one population of only two wild plants. The species is listed as Threatened - Nationally Critical in the most recent assessment (2023) of the New Zealand Threatened Classification for plants. Its status was unchanged from the 2017 assessment, where it was listed as "Craspedia (qq) (CHR 167368; Wakanui)".

In addition to qualifiers CD ("Conservation dependent"), and OL ("One location"), C. diversicolor also has the qualifier CI ("Climate impact"). The CI qualifier has been used by the Department of Conservation since 2021 to flag species in its conservation assessments that are "adversely affected by long-term climate trends and/or extreme climatic events."

== Conservation efforts ==
In 2001, Brietweiser and Ford, together with David Purcell, brought a single plant of C. diversifolia into the glasshouses at Manaaki Whenua - Landcare Research glasshouses for cultivation. In 2020, they together with collaborators successfully crossed that plant with pollen from plants still found at the wild population to produce seed and additional plants. In this way, about 80 plants were cultivated in the glasshouse, and now 50 of these are growing at four sites, having been planted in collaboration with Forest & Bird at a scientific reserve, as well as at Christchurch Botanic Gardens and a two other sites. Although the immediate threat of extinction has perhaps been averted, active conservation management is necessary to ensure its survival into the future.
