= Billy buttons =

Billy buttons may refer to one of several genera of daisies native to Australia:

- Craspedia
- Pycnosorus
