= Craspedia huriawa =

Conservation status
- Nationally Critical (NZ TCS)

Scientific classification
- Kingdom: Plantae
- Clade: Tracheophytes
- Clade: Angiosperms
- Clade: Eudicots
- Clade: Asterids
- Order: Asterales
- Family: Asteraceae
- Genus: Craspedia
- Species: C. huriawa

Binomial name
- Craspedia huriawa Breitw. & Courtney

Species of flowering plant

Craspedia huriawa, or Riuwaka woollyhead, is a species of Craspedia endemic to New Zealand. It was described in 2022 by New Zealand botanists Ilse Breitwieser and Shannel Courtney, and its distinguishing characteristics include short, oblanceolate to almost linear rosette leaves that are neither hairless nor woolly. It is found in lowland habitats and is one of about a dozen vascular plant species in New Zealand that is restricted to marble substrates. It is known only from the Riuwaka River North Branch, near Tākaka Hill, Pikikirunga Range, Nelson/Tasman, South Island, New Zealand.

== Description ==
Craspedia huriawa is a rhizomatous rosette herb with smooth, thin, yellowish-green leaves 2 – 11 cm long and up to 1.6 cm wide, widest above the middle, oblanceolate, gradually narrowing to a petiole, with both surfaces and edges loosely covered with short glandular hairs and longer non-glandular hairs. and the leaf edges with long (up to 3 mm long) curly hairs. Roots are fibrous. The scapes are 7 to 20 cm in length and have 2–7 sessile bracts, and are sparsely covered with longer curly hairs and shorter glandular hairs. The inflorescence is round and contains about 45 captiula and 180–230 florets. Each floret has a white 5-lobed corolla that is about 4 mm long. Anthers are white. The feathery pappus has 14–17 white bristles, and achenes are 1.3 – 1.9 mm long and 0.7–0.9 mm wide and hairy.

== Taxonomy ==
Craspedia huriawa is a species of plant in the family Asteraceae. It was described by New Zealand botanists Ilse Breitwieser and Shannel Courtney in 2022.

The type specimen was collected at the Riwaka River, N. Branch in Nelson/Tasman, South Island, New Zealand by New Zealand botanist Anthony P. Druce in November 1990, and the holotype specimen is housed at the Allan Herbarium in Lincoln, New Zealand (CHR 469764).

C. huriawa is distinguished from all other species of Craspedia by a suite of characters including short (< 5 cm), oblanceolate to almost linear rosette leaves that are neither hairless nor woolly.

The species epithet huriawa was gifted to the species by three Māori iwi (tribes) who have territorial rights over the Riuwaka River where the species occurs: Ngāti Rārua, Ngāti Tama ki Te Tau Ihu, and Te Ātiawa o Te Waka a Māui. The species name refers to Huriawa, a female supernatural being called a taniwha from nearby Te Waikoropupū Springs.

== Distribution and habitat ==
Craspedia huriawa is currently known only from the type locality at the Riuwaka River North Branch, near Tākaka Hill, Pikikirunga Range, Nelson/Tasman, South Island, New Zealand. It is found in lowland habitats and is one of about a dozen vascular plant species in New Zealand that is restricted to marble substrates.

== Conservation status ==
The species is listed as Threatened - Nationally Critical in the most recent assessment (2023) of the New Zealand Threatened Classification for plants. Its status was unchanged from the 2017 assessment, where it was listed as Craspedia (g) (CHR 469764; Pikikirunga).
