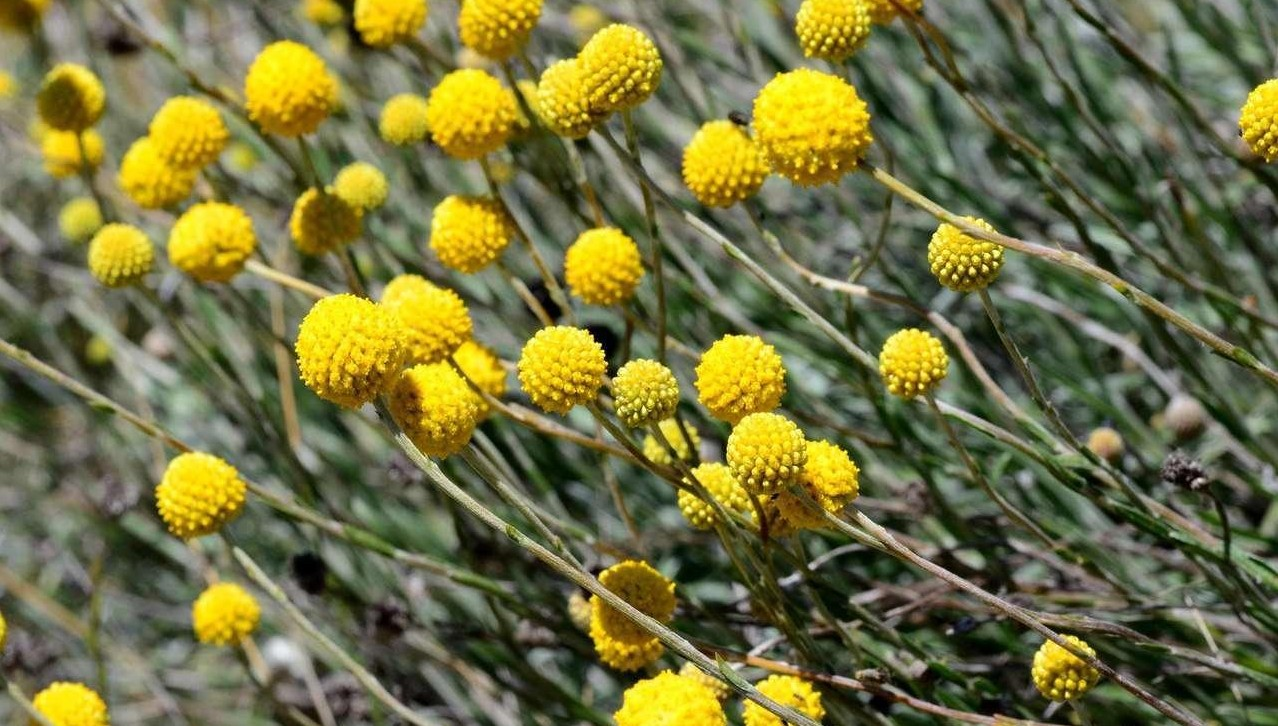

Scientific classification
- Kingdom: Plantae
- Clade: Embryophytes
- Clade: Tracheophytes
- Clade: Angiosperms
- Clade: Eudicots
- Clade: Asterids
- Order: Asterales
- Family: Asteraceae
- Genus: Pycnosorus
- Species: P. chrysanthus

Binomial name
- Pycnosorus chrysanthus (Schldl.) Sond.
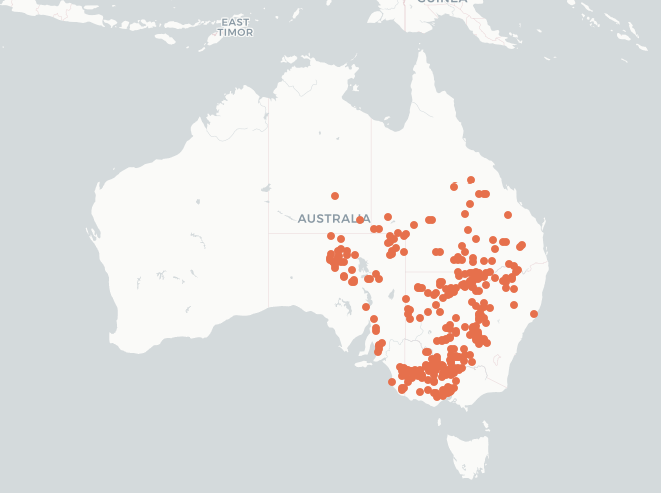
- Distribution of Pycnosorus chrysanthus within Australia.

= Pycnosorus chrysanthus =

Species of flowering plant

Pycnosorus chrysanthus, commonly known as golden billy buttons or yellow drumsticks, is a species of flowering plant in the family Asteraceae endemic to Australia. It occurs primarily in arid and semi-arid grassland and shrubland ecosystems of central and eastern Australia, where it is adapted to dry environments. The species is distinguished by its globular golden inflorescences and is regionally listed as endangered in parts of its range.

== Description ==
Pycnosorus chrysanthus is an erect, tufted herb that typically grows up to about 60 cm (24 in) in height. The stems are usually unbranched and densely covered in white to grey woolly hairs. The leaves are mostly narrow, measuring approximately 1–10 cm (0.4–3.9 in) long and 1–7 mm (0.04–0.28 in) wide. Basal leaves tend to wither early, while the stem leaves are arranged alternately and may be olive green to brown above and woolly beneath, with prominent hairs along the margins and midrib. The species is distinguished by its distinctive globular to ovoid flower heads, which are bright yellow and typically 8–15 mm (0.31–0.59 in) in diameter. Each flower head is composed of numerous small florets tightly packed into a spherical, "button like" cluster. Flowering generally occurs in spring and summer, after which the plant produces small, hairy seeds.

== Taxonomy ==
The species belongs to the genus Pycnosorus, which is in the family Asteraceae. Members of this genus are commonly referred to as "billy buttons" or "drumsticks" due to their distinctive spherical flower heads. P. chrysanthes was first formally described in the 19th century, with its currently accepted name published by Otto Wilhelm Sonder in 1853.

The species has been known by several earlier names, including Craspedia chrysantha and Calocephalus chrysanthes, reflecting historical changes in classification. The genus name Pycnosorus is derived from Greek words meaning "dense heap", referring to the compact flower heads, while the species epithet chrysanthes (or chrysanthus) means "golden flowered".

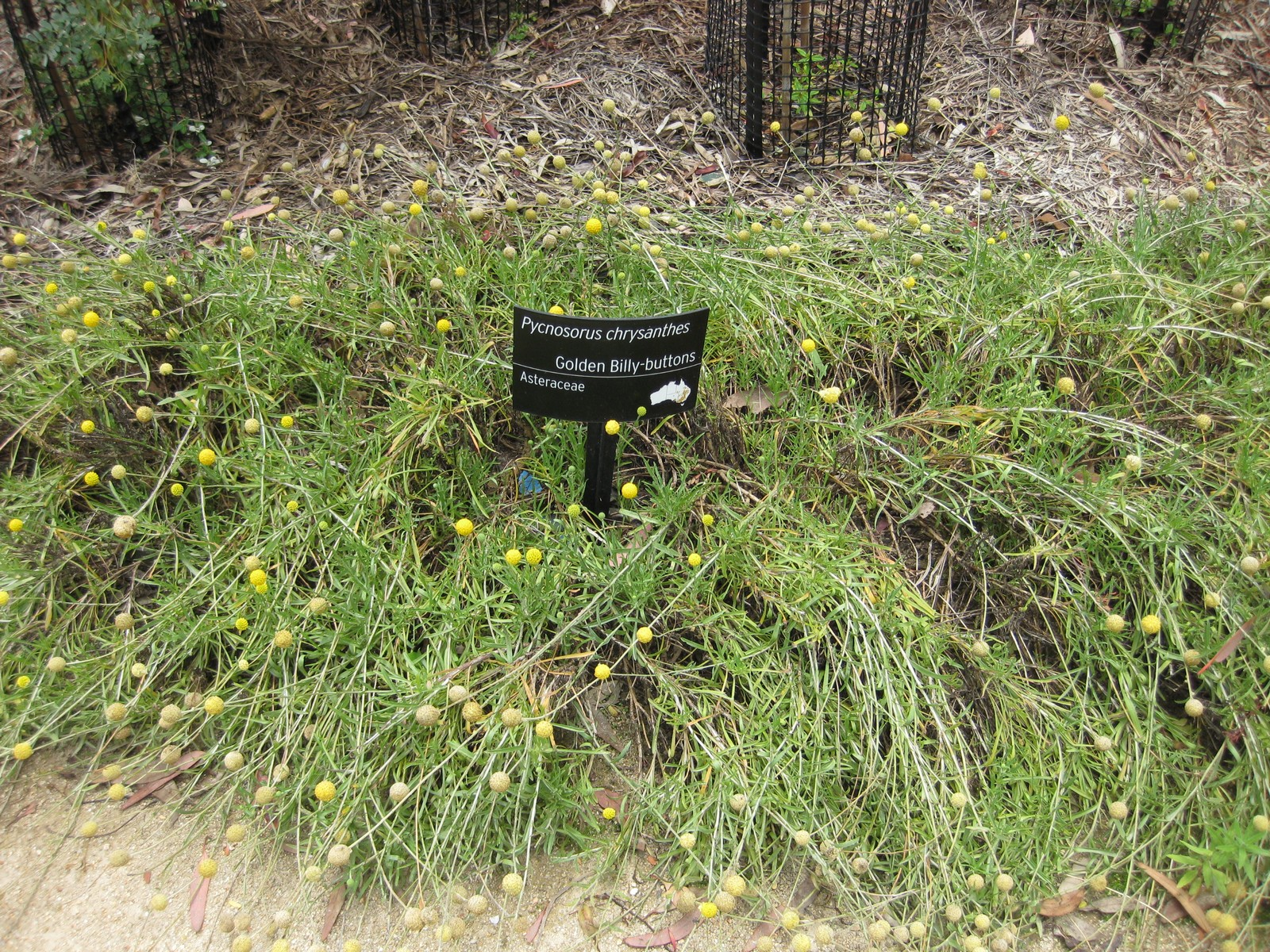

== Distribution and habitat ==
Pycnosorus chrysanthus is endemic to mainland Australia and is distributed across central and eastern regions, including New South Wales, Queensland, Victoria, and South Australia. The species typically inhabits grasslands, woodlands, and shrublands, often in dry or seasonally moist environments. It is commonly found in open areas, sometimes on heavy soils, and is associated with semi‑arid to temperate regions. Although broadly distributed, its conservation status varies regionally; for example, it is considered endangered in parts of South Australia while more common in other states.

The species typically inhabits inland environments and is associated with grassland and shrubland biomes. It has been recorded in seasonally wet depressions within otherwise dry shrubland systems. Occurrence records from the Atlas of Living Australia indicate a broad but patchy distribution.

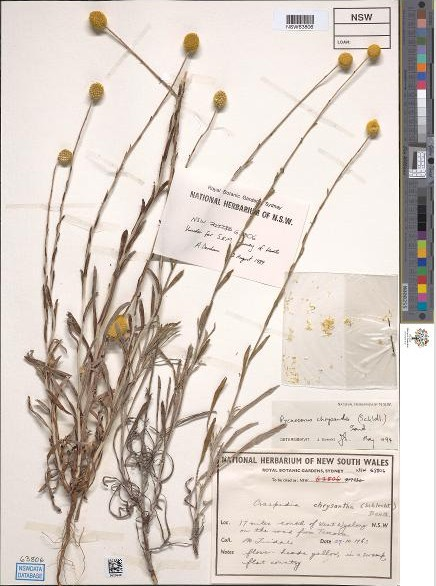
Specimen from 1963

== Ecology ==
Pycnosorus chrysanthus occurs in arid and semi-arid grasslands, chenopod shrublands, and open woodlands of central and eastern Australia, where it is adapted to low and variable rainfall and open habitats. Species of Pycnosorus are typically associated with dry, nutrient-poor soils and occur in environments where disturbance and seasonal variability influence plant persistence. As the species is a short lived perennial herb, it can respond rapidly to favourable seasonal conditions, particularly rainfall.

The species exhibits adaptations typical of arid-zone flora, including woolly leaf surfaces that reduce water loss and protect against high solar radiation. These traits reflect adaptation to water-limited environments, where reduced leaf surface exposure and reflective surfaces help maintain plant water balance and reduce thermal stress.

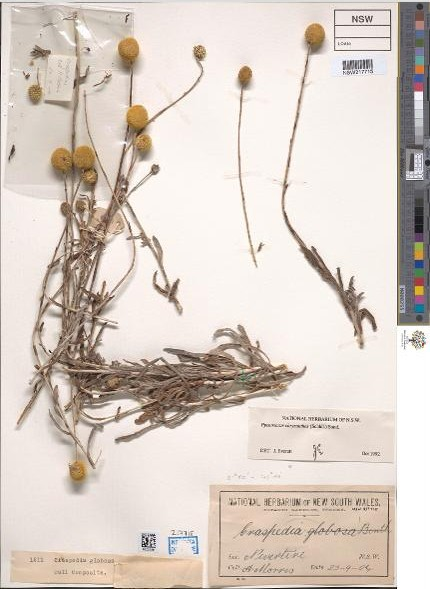
Specimen from 1924

== Life history ==
Pycnosorus chrysanthus is an annual or short-lived perennial herb.

Flowering occurs mainly in spring and summer, consistent with patterns reported across the genus. As a member of the Asteraceae, P. chrysanthus produces capitula (flower heads) composed of many small florets, which function together as a single floral unit. This structure improves pollination by concentrating floral resources and increasing visibility to insect pollinators.

Basal leaves wither early in development, while cauline leaves persist along the stem. The species reproduces sexually via seed production, with flowering phenology closely linked to seasonal rainfall patterns typical of Australian dryland ecosystems.

Following pollination, the species produces dry fruits (achenes) often associated with bristles (pappus), which facilitate wind dispersal. Wind dispersal is common among Asteraceae in Australian grasslands and is particularly effective in open and sparsely vegetated environments, where seeds can colonise disturbed sites and maintain population connectivity.

== Conservation status ==
Pycnosorus chrysanthus has a variable conservation status across its range in Australia. It is listed as endangered in South Australia under state conservation frameworks, where populations are considered rare and declining.

Regional assessments indicate that the species is uncommon or threatened in parts of South Australia, while it remains more widespread in other states, including New South Wales, Victoria, and Queensland. The species is listed as Protected in New South Wales.

There is no confirmed national listing under the Australian Environment Protection and Biodiversity Conservation Act (EPBC Act). As a result, its conservation status is best described as regionally threatened rather than nationally endangered.

The decline of native grasslands in Australia, one of the most extensively modified ecosystems, has contributed to habitat fragmentation for this species. Changes to fire regimes and grazing pressure may also influence population dynamics. Major threats include land clearing, agricultural intensification, and degradation of native grasslands. Conservation measures focus on habitat protection, restoration of native vegetation, and monitoring of populations.

== Evolutionary relationships ==
The species belongs to the genus Pycnosorus within the tribe Gnaphalieae of the family Asteraceae. Phylogenetic analyses based on ribosomal and chloroplast DNA indicate that Pycnosorus forms a monophyletic group distinct from the closely related genus Craspedia.

Historically, species now placed in Pycnosorus were included in Craspedia, but morphological differences, such as sessile inflorescences and differences in chromosome number, led to the reinstatement of Pycnosorus as a distinct genus.

The genus comprises six species all endemic to Australia and adapted to a range of arid and temperate habitats.
