= Craspedia rugosa =

- The Lake Heron woollyhead

Conservation status
- Nationally Critical (NZ TCS)

Scientific classification
- Kingdom: Plantae
- Clade: Tracheophytes
- Clade: Angiosperms
- Clade: Eudicots
- Clade: Asterids
- Order: Asterales
- Family: Asteraceae
- Genus: Craspedia
- Species: C. rugosa

Binomial name
- Craspedia rugosa Breitw. & K.A. Ford

Species of flowering plant

Craspedia rugosa, or Lake Heron woollyhead, is a species of Craspedia endemic to New Zealand. It was described in 2022 by New Zealand botanists Ilse Breitwieser and Kerry Ford and two of its distinguishing characteristics are its dark red-purple anthers and wrinkled leaves covered in woolly hairs. It is considered Threatened - Nationally Critical.

== Description ==
Craspedia rugosa is a small rhizomatous rosette herb with olive-green, grey or dark red leaves 2 – 5 cm long and 0.5 – 1 cm wide, wrinkled (rugose), mottled grey and dark red, widest at or above the middle, gradually narrowing to a petiole, and with both surfaces and edges thinly to moderately covered with silver-grey woolly hairs. Roots are fibrous. The scapes can reach 7 or 8 cm in length and have 3–5 sessile bracts, and are sparsely covered with wooly hairs. The inflorescence is round and contains about 20 captiula and 110 florets. Each floret has a pale yellow 5-lobed corolla that is about 4 mm long. Anthers are dark red-purple at first, turning pale yellow-green with dark purple stripes and finally brown after flowering has finished. The feathery pappus has 15–18 white bristles, and achenes are 1 – 2 mm long and about 1 mm wide and hairy.

== Taxonomy ==
Craspedia rugosa is a species of plant in the family Asteraceae. It was described by New Zealand botanists Ilse Breitwieser and Kerry Ford in 2022.

The type specimen was collected at Lake Heron, in an outwash fan of the Cameron River by Breitwieser in 1999, and the holotype specimen is housed at the Allan Herbarium in Lincoln, New Zealand (CHR 638310) Canterbury, New Zealand.

The species epithet rugosa means 'wrinkled' and refers to the leaves.

C. rugosa is one of four species in the genus described in the same article in 2022, including C. diversicolor, C. thinicola and C. argentea, all of which have dark red-purple anthers and, similar to C. lanata, woolly hairs covering the rosette leaves (lanate). C. rugosa is distinguished from the other species with red-purple anthers by multiple vegetative and reproductive characters including those of the scape, rosette leaves, inflorescences (clusters of flowers), florets (small flowers), achenes (one-seeded fruits), and pappus (the feathery part of the fruit).

Plant growing in moss Racomitrium

== Distribution and habitat ==
Craspedia rugosa is currently known from the type locality (Cameron Fan, near Lake Heron), Canterbury, South Island, New Zealand. Based on another herbarium specimen record from near Oxford where the plant no longer occurs, the distribution of C. rugosa may have been wider than it is currently.

The species grows in dry, short tussockland in harsh conditions, with the moss Racomitrium lanuginosum and grasses Festuca novae-zelandiae and Anthoxanthum odoratum. C. rugosa flowers and fruits in January and February.

== Conservation status ==
The species is listed as Threatened - Nationally Critical in the most recent assessment (2023) of the New Zealand Threatened Classification for plants. It also has the qualifiers DPT ("Data Poor Trend"), and OL ("One location"). Its status was unchanged from the 2017 assessment, where it was listed as Craspedia (j) (CHR 516302; Lake Heron). Conservation efforts at the Department of Conservation are ongoing.
