= Craspedia =

Craspedia may refer to:

- Craspedia (fly), a genus of flies in the family Asilidae
- Craspedia (plant), a genus of plants in the family Asteraceae
- Craspedia (moth), a genus of moths in the family Geometridae, now placed in the genus Scopula
