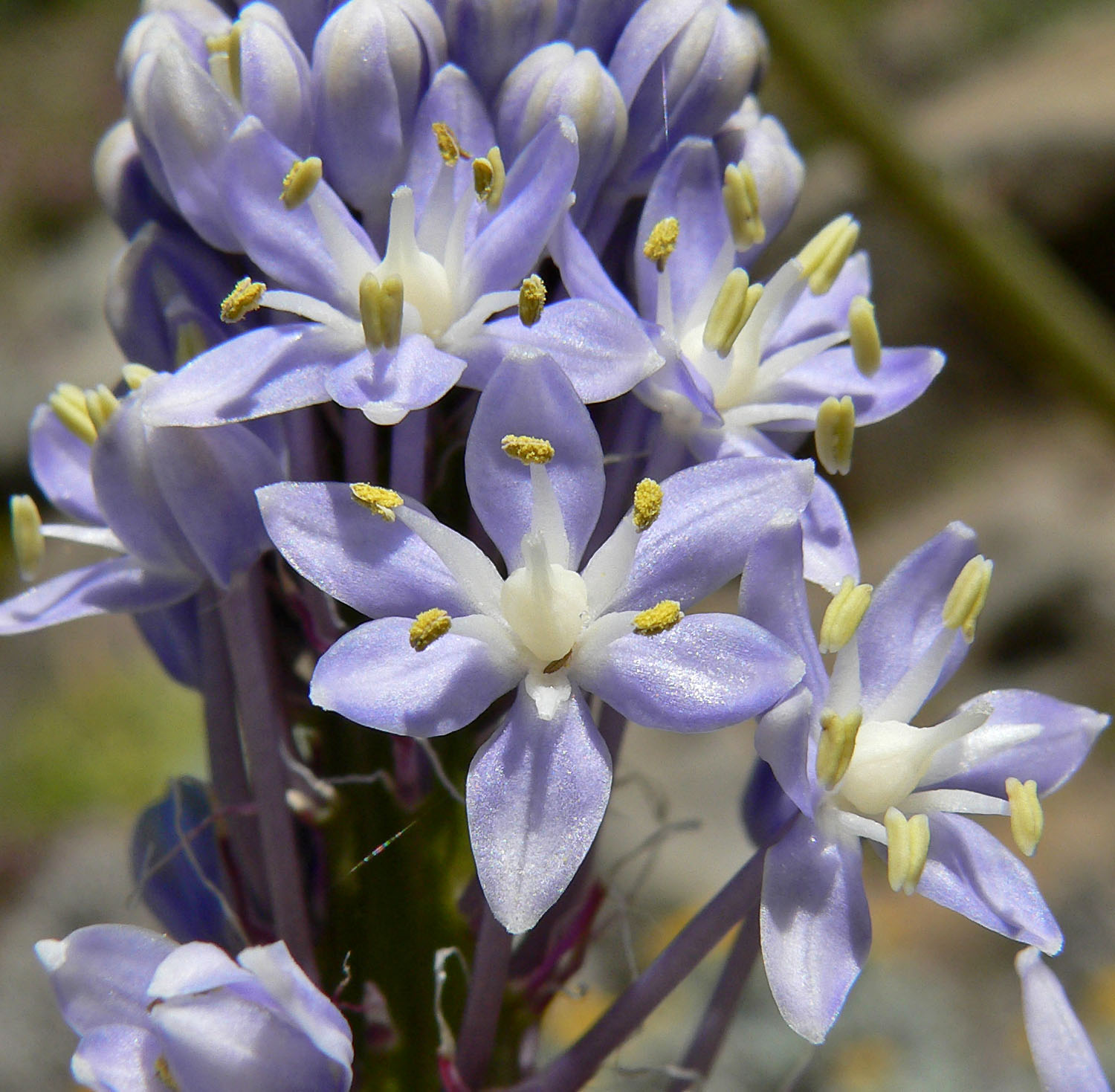
- Merwilla plumbea

Scientific classification
- Kingdom: Plantae
- Clade: Tracheophytes
- Clade: Angiosperms
- Clade: Monocots
- Order: Asparagales
- Family: Asparagaceae
- Subfamily: Scilloideae
- Genus: Merwilla; Speta

Species
- 3, see text

= Merwilla =

Genus of flowering plants

Merwilla is a genus of bulbous flowering plants in the family Asparagaceae, subfamily Scilloideae (also treated as the family Hyacinthaceae). It is distributed in southern Africa, from Zimbabwe to South Africa. This genus is named after the botanist Frederick Ziervogel Van der Merwe (1894–1968), who worked on this group.

== Description ==
Species of Merwilla grow from relatively large bulbs, the upper part of which is usually above ground. The bulbs have light yellow to gray tunics. Plants have broad leaves. The flowers are borne in a raceme. Each flower has six blue tepals, forming a star shape. The stamens have white filaments which are joined at the base and small anthers. The oblong seeds are brownish when dry, paler when fresh. The seed colour distinguishes Merwilla from related genera, which have glossy black or dark brown seeds.

== Systematics ==
The genus Merwilla was created by Franz Speta in 1998 for some species formerly included in Scilla. The genus is placed in the tribe Hyacintheae (or the subfamily Hyacinthoideae by those who use the family Hyacinthaceae).

=== Species ===
As of April 2013, the World Checklist of Selected Plant Families recognized the following species. All three were formerly placed in the genus Scilla.

- Merwilla dracomontana (Hilliard & B.L.Burtt) Speta
- Merwilla lazulina (Wild) Speta
- Merwilla plumbea (Lindl.) Speta
