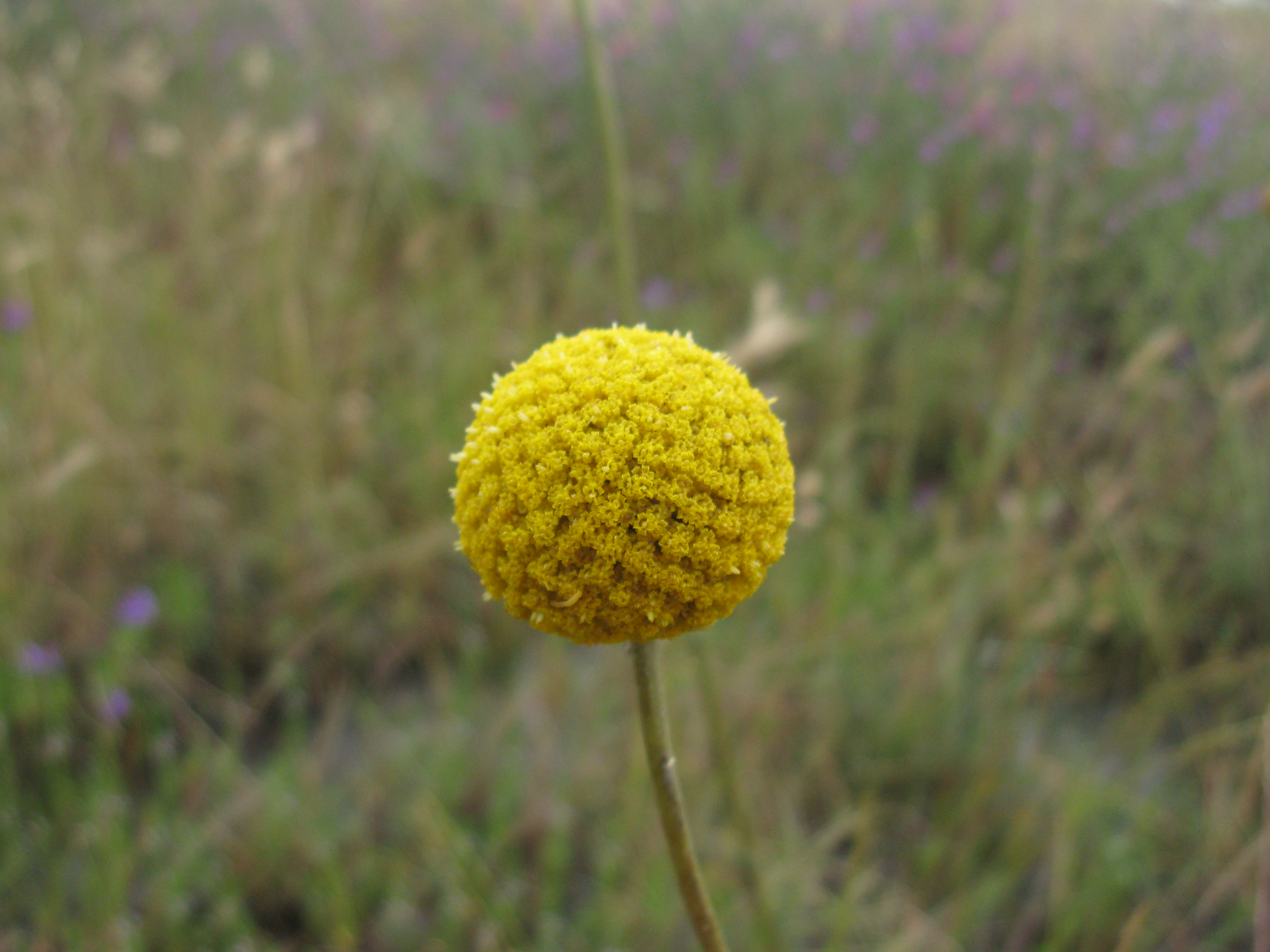

Scientific classification
- Kingdom: Plantae
- Clade: Tracheophytes
- Clade: Angiosperms
- Clade: Eudicots
- Clade: Asterids
- Order: Asterales
- Family: Asteraceae
- Genus: Pycnosorus
- Species: P. globosus

Binomial name
- Pycnosorus globosus Benth.

= Pycnosorus globosus =

Species of plant

Pycnosorus globosus is a plant of the Asteraceae family native to New South Wales, Queensland, South Australia, and Victoria. Along with a number of other species of the genus Pycnosorus, its common names include "drumsticks" and "Billy Buttons".
