= Craspedia paludicola =

Scientific classification
- Kingdom: Plantae
- Clade: Tracheophytes
- Clade: Angiosperms
- Clade: Eudicots
- Clade: Asterids
- Order: Asterales
- Family: Asteraceae
- Genus: Craspedia
- Species: C. paludicola

Binomial name
- Craspedia paludicola J.Everett & Doust
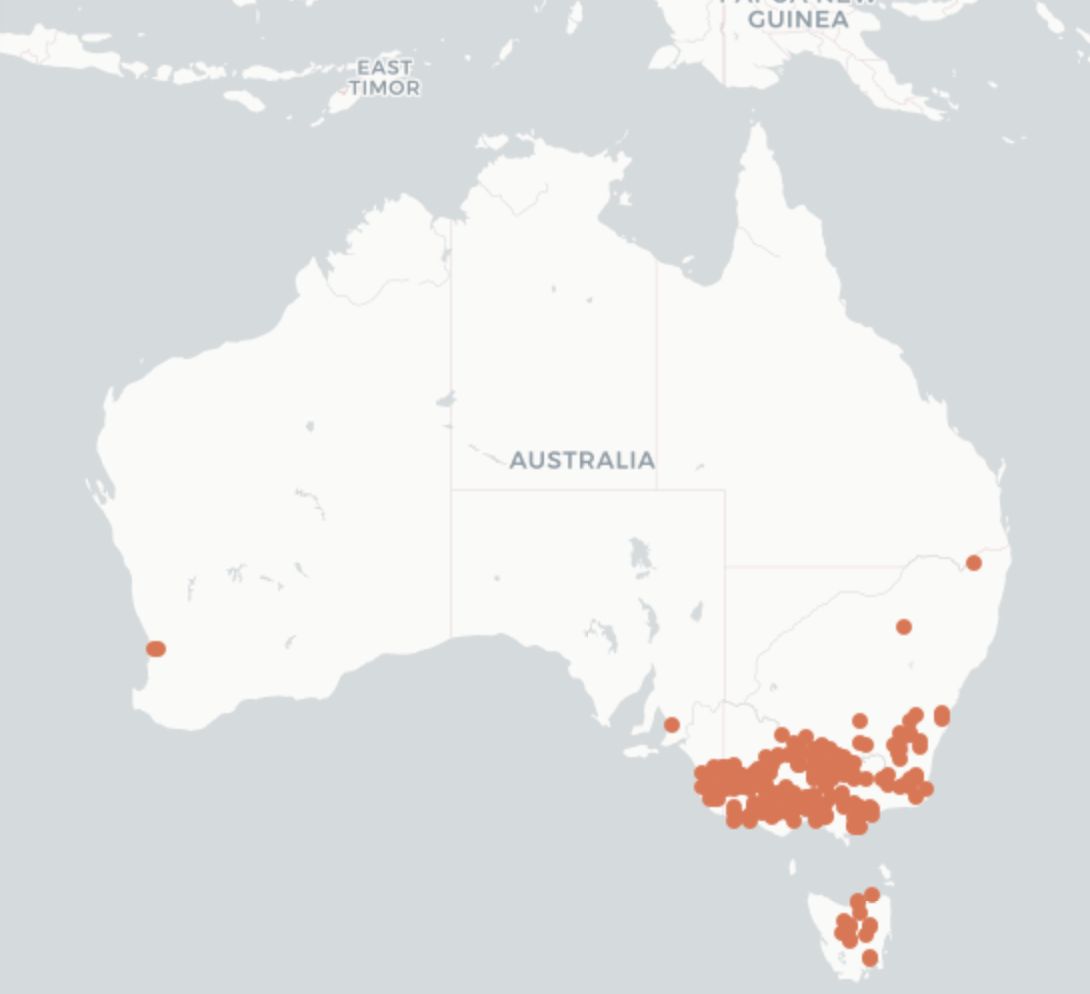
- Distribution of Craspedia paludicola

Species of flowering plant

Craspedia paludicola, commonly known as the swamp billy-buttons, is a perennial robust herb native to Australia.

== Description ==
Craspedia paludicola is an upright, rosette-forming herb with a vegetative height of 25 to 75 cm (9.8 to 29.5 in), belonging to the Asteraceae family.

The flaccid leaves are 150 to 400 mm (5.9 to 15.7 in) long and 8 to 20 mm (0.31 to 0.79 in) wide, basal and cauline, narrow-oblanceolate, obtuse, attenuate at the base and broadly stem clasping. They have one to several prominent longitudinal veins and are glabrous or with few scattered finely woolly or multiseptated white hairs that are sometimes denser on the margins or midrib. The leaves are dark grey-green or olive-green, usually with a red base and the old leaf-bases are retained.

Each plant has one to three flowering scapes, reddish to purplish in colour, up to 75 cm (30 in) in height and scattered with fine hairs.

The inflorescence is bright-yellow single globular compound or button-like head 1.7 to 3 cm (0.67 to 1.18 in) in diameter with up to 300 capitula on peduncles 2 to 5 mm (0.079 to 0.197 in) long. Each capitula or head consists of 7 to 12 florets with bright yellow corollas surrounded by a ring of bracts with glandular, silky hairs, the main bract deltoid to ovate shaped with membranous margins. Cypselas (seeds) are 1 to 1.8 mm (0.039 to 0.071 in) with a pappus 3 to 4 mm (0.12 to 0.16 in) long. Flowers bloom September to February.

== Habitat and distribution ==
Craspedia paludicola is widespread in Victoria and southeastern New South Wales (including the Australian Capital Territory), considered rare in Tasmania and considered vulnerable in South Australia. Outlying occurrences can be found in northern New South Wales and southern Queensland historical records have been found at a site in Western Australia.

In Tasmania, the species is scattered across 14 locations, recorded in lowland areas across the eastern side of the state, and up to 1,200 m (3,900 ft) above sea level in montane sites in the Central Highlands. It is considered uncommon in wet subalpine and alpine areas.

Although rarely encountered, the species can be abundant in small occurrences. and considered locally common on heavy clay soils and is tolerant of inundation, often found partially submerged. It typically grows around bodies of water including the edges of lakes, lagoons, rivers, creeks and streams, or in open wet areas that are inundated temporarily, such as bogs, swamps, ponds, and ditches. It is found in a variety of vegetation types including open wetlands, marshland, rushland, sedgeland and grassland.

The abundance and distribution of the species is likely regulated by conditions that maintain, or require disturbance to create, open recruitment niches. It is likely that conditions providing protection from grazers, such as steep banks, can support the dominance of the species.
