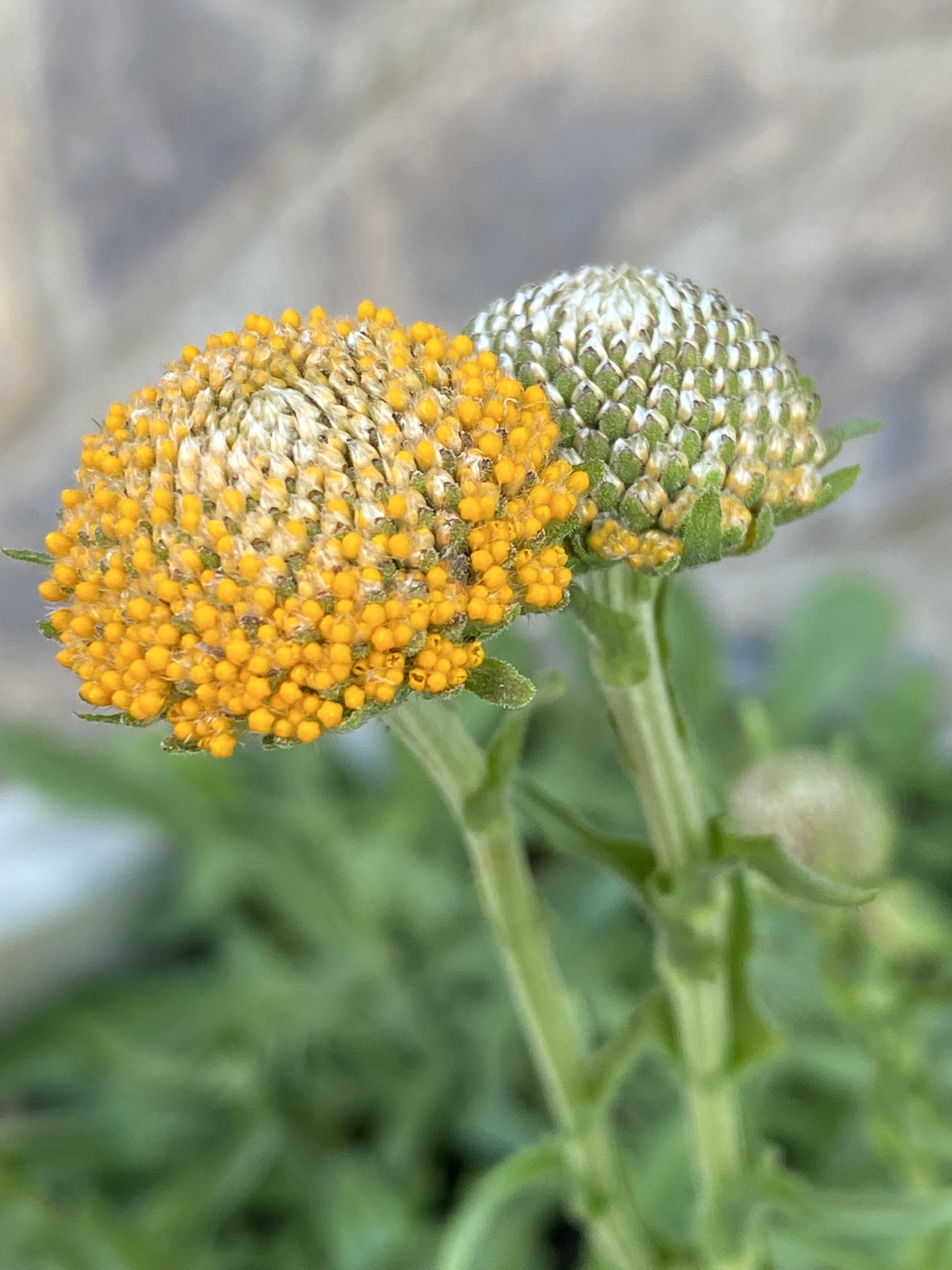

Scientific classification
- Kingdom: Plantae
- Clade: Tracheophytes
- Clade: Angiosperms
- Clade: Eudicots
- Clade: Asterids
- Order: Asterales
- Family: Asteraceae
- Genus: Craspedia
- Species: C. aurantia

Binomial name
- Craspedia aurantia J.Everett & Joy Thomps.

= Craspedia aurantia =

Species of flowering plant

Craspedia aurantia, is a flowering plant in the family Asteraceae and grows in New South Wales and Victoria. It has light green leaves and heads of yellow to reddish-brown flowers on a single flowering stem.

== Description ==
Craspedia aurantia is a herbaceous plant with a single flowering stem 15–60 cm (5.9–23.6 in) long and roots densely covered in thick, matted hairs. The leaves are mostly attached at the base, spoon-shaped, 2–16 mm (0.079–0.630 in) long, 2–25 mm (0.079–0.984 in) wide, pointed to broadly tapering to a point, narrowing gradually at the base, and glabrous or sparsely hairy. The yellow to orange-brown flowers are borne in heads 15–30 mm (0.59–1.18 in) in diameter with about 40-90 florets in each head. Flowering occurs in summer and the fruit is a cypsela 0.5–1.5 mm (0.020–0.059 in) long and 0.1–0.8 mm (0.0039–0.0315 in) wide.

== Taxonomy and naming ==
Craspedia aurantia was first formally described in 1992 by Joy Everett and Joy Thompson and the description was published in Telopea. The specific epithet (aurantia) means "orange" in reference to the colour of the flowerheads.

== Distribution and habitat ==
This species grows in alpine and subalpine grassland and heath in New South Wales and Victoria.
