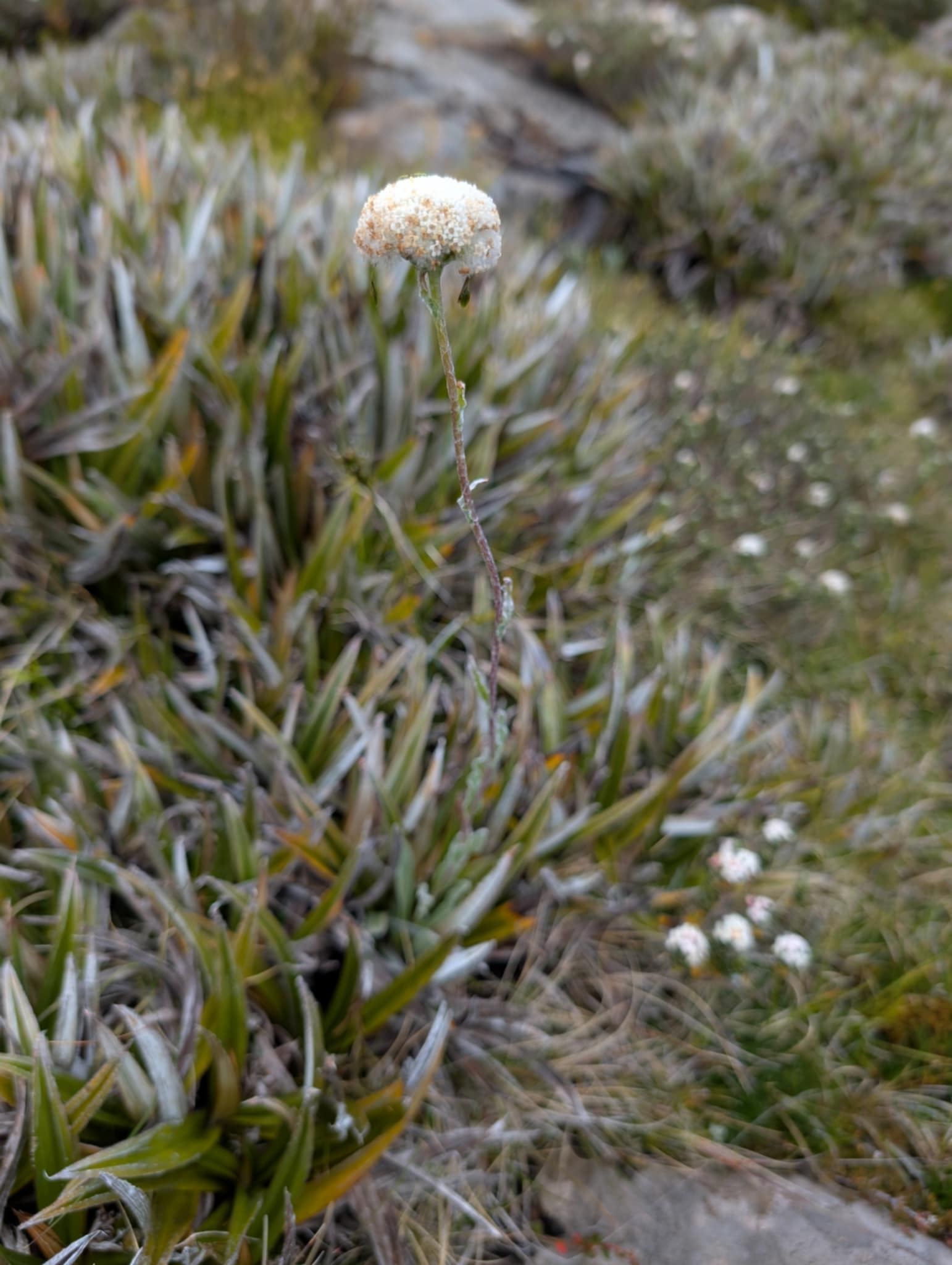

Scientific classification
- Kingdom: Plantae
- Clade: Tracheophytes
- Clade: Angiosperms
- Clade: Eudicots
- Clade: Asterids
- Order: Asterales
- Family: Asteraceae
- Genus: Craspedia
- Species: C. macrocephala

Binomial name
- Craspedia macrocephala Hook.
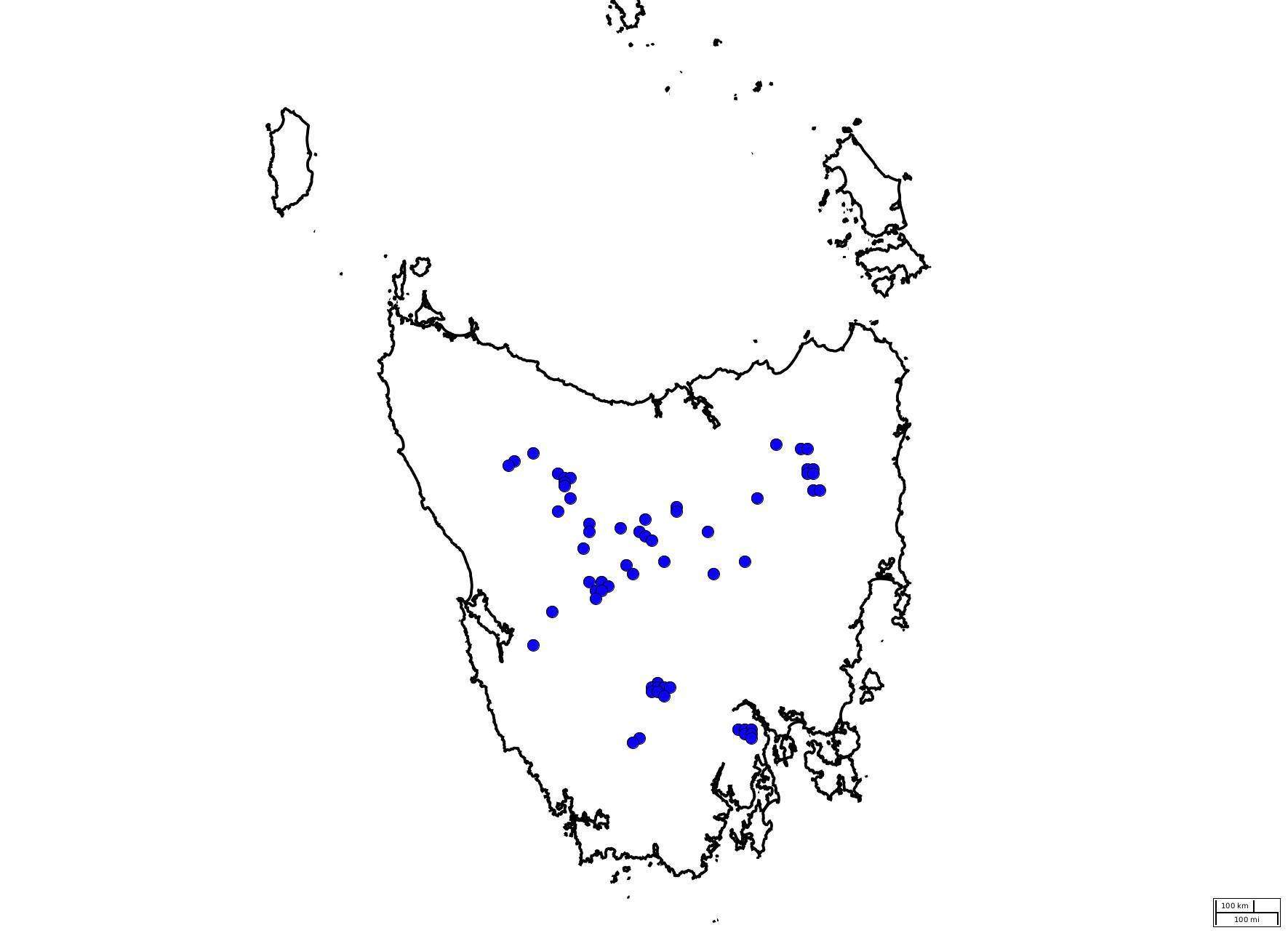

Synonyms
- Craspedia alpina Backh. ex Hook.fil.; Craspedia glauca var. macrocephala (Hook.) W.M.Curtis; Craspedia richea var. alpina Benth.; Craspedia richea var. macrocephala (Hook.) Benth.

= Craspedia macrocephala =

Species of flowering plant

Craspedia macrocephala, commonly known as Alpine billybutton, is a species of flowering plant in the Asteraceae family that is widespread and endemic in subalpine and alpine areas of Tasmania. It is a robust herb that produces a single flowering scape with a conspicuous, almost spherical head of densely packed white florets that bloom from January-March.

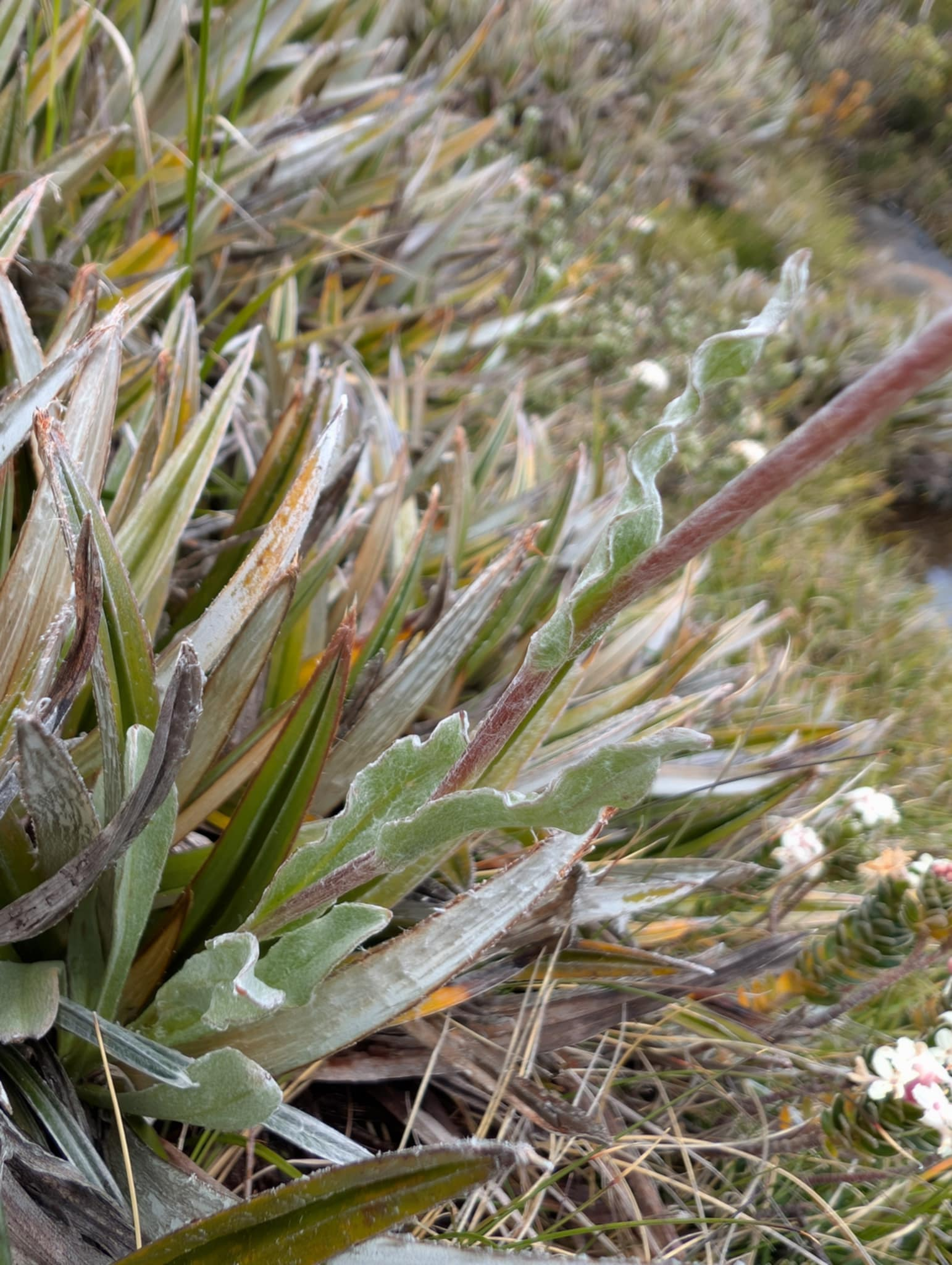
Craspedia macrocephala at Mt Field

== Description ==
Craspedia macrocephala is a tall daisy that grows a pale, grey-green to purplish scape up to 30cm high. The base of the scape is surrounded by a rosette of soft woolly leaves that are green-grey in colour and elliptical in shape. Leaf size varies from 5-13cm long and 0.7-1.2cm wide and have a pronounced mid-vein. The leaves become bracts (reduced leaf scales) as they continue up the scape to the base of the flowerhead. Often the leaves are covered with fine hairs up to 3mm long, which can be denser on the lower surface, and sparse on the upper surface. C.macrocephala produces a compound head of tiny white florets that is almost spherical in appearance. The inflorescence can be up to 26mm in diameter and contain 70-100 partial heads, each containing 5-6 individual florets. The florets are white and tubular with fused petals and yellow, tailed anthers. The fruit (achenes) are obovoid and covered with scattered glandular hairs (trichomes) and a ring of bristles (pappus) fused at the base.

Craspedia can be taxonomically difficult to identify due to their morphological variation. In nutrient poor soils plants may be stunted in size, while in moist, nutrient rich environments they generally grow larger. C. macrocephala can be distinguished from other Tasmanian species in the same genus by its white inflorescence in combination with the presence of dense hairs on the lower leaf surface.

== Distribution ==
Craspedia macrocephala are endemic to Tasmania and grow in subalpine and alpine areas above 1000m largely on dolerite mountains in open sedgeland and heath. It has been recorded at kunanyi (Mt Wellington), Mt Field, Ben Lomond, Mt Barrow, and in the Central Highlands.

== Taxonomy and naming ==
Craspedia macrocephala was first described by W.J. Hooker in 1835 from specimens collected in the Western Tiers. Historically, this species was also referred to as Craspedia alpina. In the 19th century, C.macrocephala and C.alpina were considered distinct by botanists but have since been found to be synonymous. Misidentification of Craspedia specimens is potentially common due to their morphological plasticity and difficulty in retaining inflorescence colour.
