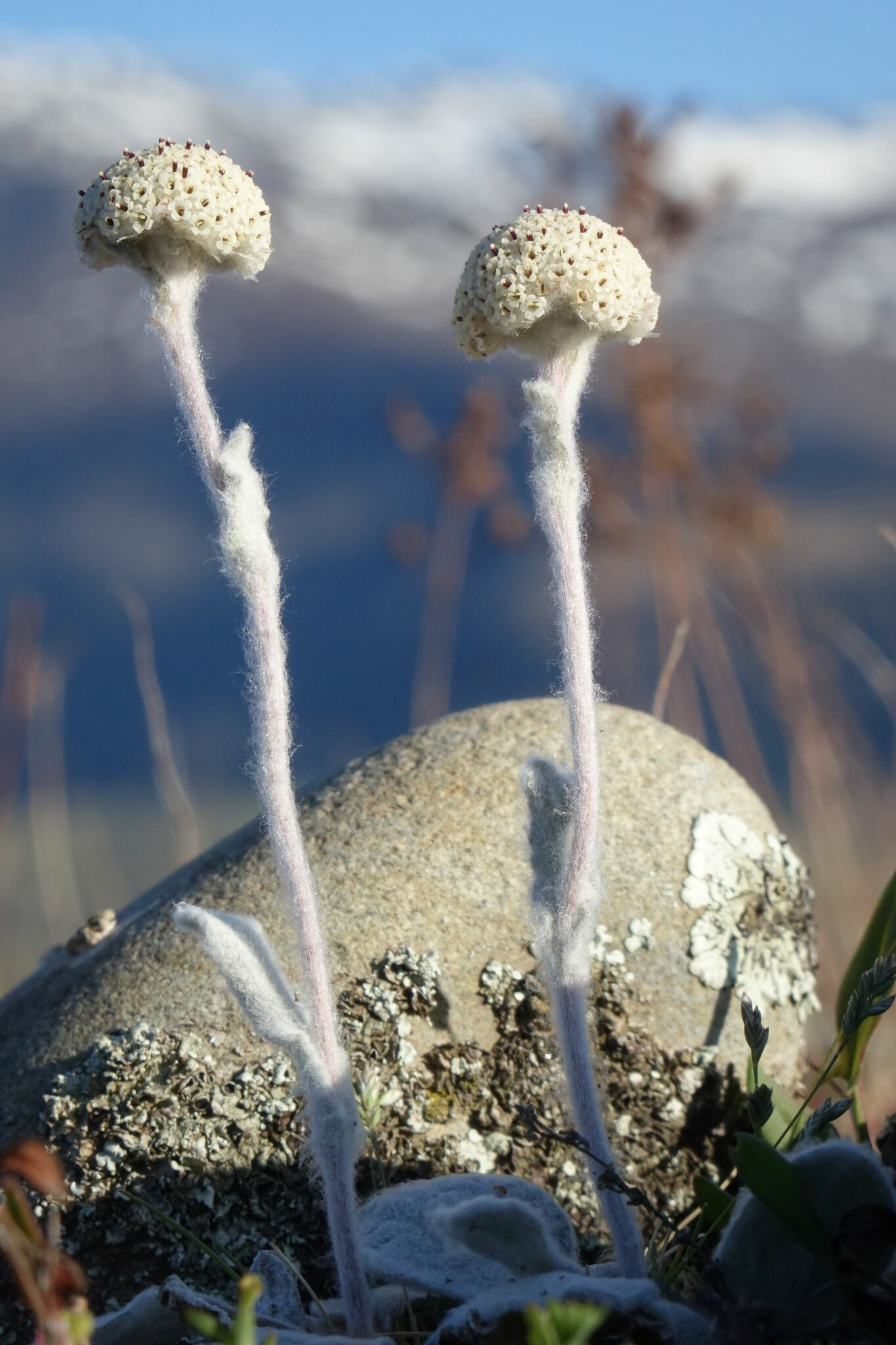
- Central Otago District, New Zealand

Conservation status
- Nationally Critical (NZ TCS)

Scientific classification
- Kingdom: Plantae
- Clade: Tracheophytes
- Clade: Angiosperms
- Clade: Eudicots
- Clade: Asterids
- Order: Asterales
- Family: Asteraceae
- Genus: Craspedia
- Species: C. argentea

Binomial name
- Craspedia argentea Breitw. & K.A.Ford

= Craspedia argentea =

Plant species in the sunflower family

Craspedia argentea, the Pisa Flats woollyhead, is a rare plant species from South Island in New Zealand.

== Description ==
Pisa Flats woollyhead is a small rhizomatous plant with rosettes of silver-gray leaves that produces flowering stems 5 to 13 centimetres tall. The rhizomes can be 2.7–3 cm long and have numerous fibrous roots, mostly unbranched, thick, and dark brown.

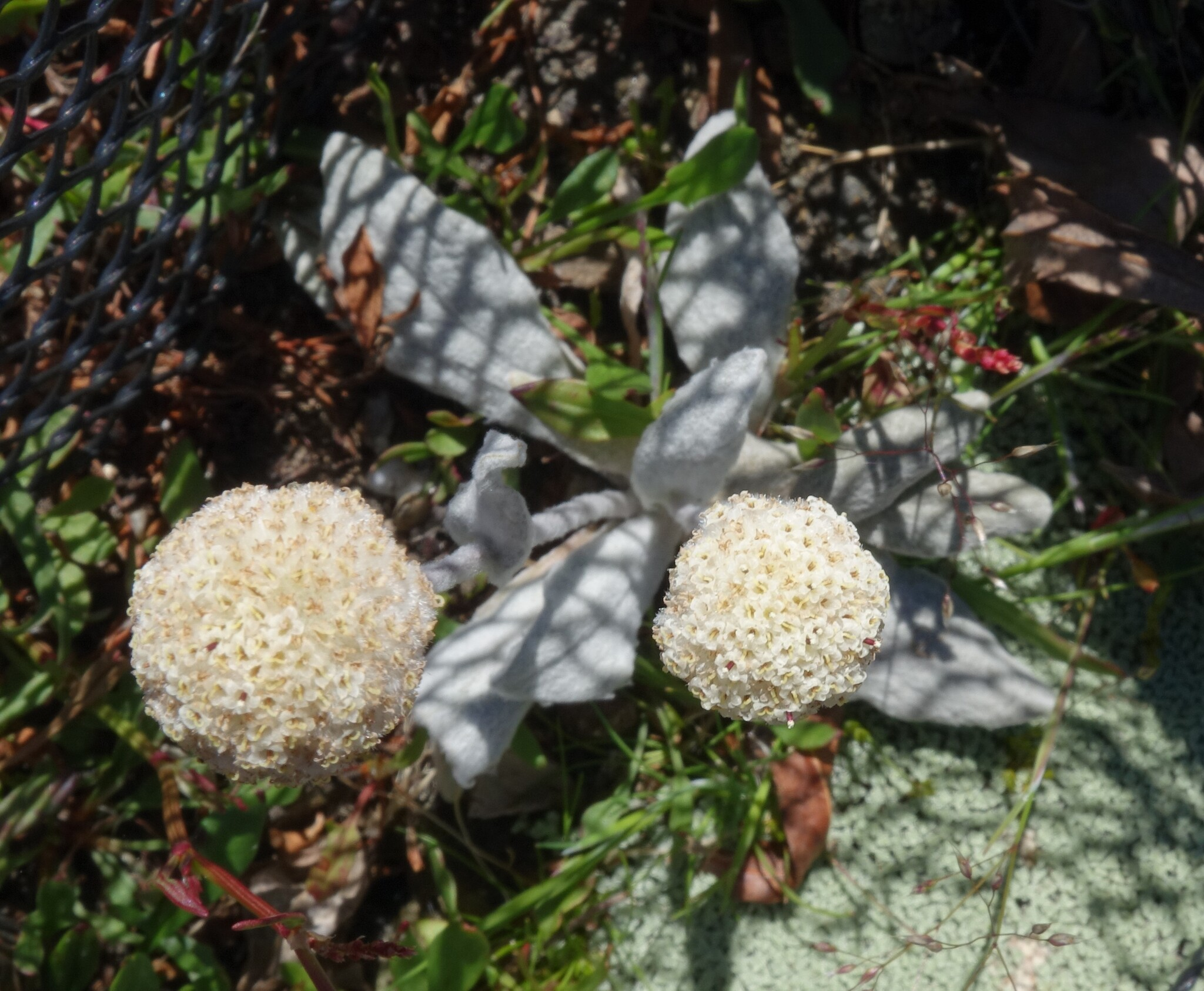
Plant with short flowering stems

Each rosette has five to ten leaves usually measuring 2.2–4.1 cm long, but occasionally reaching as much as 5.3 cm. Their width is 0.7–1.6 cm and all parts are thickly covered in silver-gray, woolly hairs that can be tightly pressed to the leaf surface or loose and fluffy. Leaves are elliptic, narrowly elliptic, obovate, spatulate, or oblanceolate with a width that is usually about half the length and gradually taper to the leaf stem.

Each rosette can produce one or two flowering stems topped with tightly packed cluster of around 40 flowering heads that is hemisphere shaped early in the flowering and nearly spherical at maturity, 1.6–1.8 cm wide and 1.5–1.6 cm high. Each stem has two to five bracts that resemble the leaves, but are smaller and not as wide. They also become smaller the further up the stem they are located. Though the stems can range from 5 to 13 cm in length, they are typically 8 to 9 cm long. Each of the flowering heads usually has six or seven ﬂorets, but occasionally as few as five. They have a yellow-white corolla of fused petals with five lobes, about 3.8 millimetres long. Flowering can start in early October and might be as late as mid-November in its native range.

The fruit is an achene, a dry fruit containing a single seed, that is gray-brown and 2.4–3 mm long. Seeds are produced from late November to the end of December.

== Taxonomy ==
Craspedia argentea was scientifically described and named in 2022 by Ilse Breitwieser and Kerry Ford, together with three other species, C. thinicola, C. diversicolor and C. rugosa, all of which have dark red-purple anthers and, similar to C. lanata, woolly hairs covering the rosette leaves (lanate). C. argentea is classified in the genus Craspedia which is in the Asteraceae family. It has no subspecies or botanical synonyms.

=== Names ===
The species name, argentea, is Botanical Latin meaning 'silvery' and was selected by Breitwieser and Ford because of the silvery appearance of the plant. It is known by the common name Pisa Flats woollyhead.

== Range and habitat ==
The only known population of the species is west of the Lake Dunstan reservoir on the Pisa Flats in Central Otago. The Pisa Flats woollyhead grows in a gravelly area with fine, silty soil of about 25 hectares at the top of a scarp and the slope near the top at 210 metres. It and other rare species adapted to this environment are protected in the Mahaka Katia Scientific Reserve.

=== Conservation ===
Despite growing in a protected area the species has declined in numbers. A survey in November 2010 only located 65 flowering plants and 357 non-flowering plants. In November 2020 only 24 plants were located and only one of these was flowering. With the smaller population of plants the natural pollination network broke down and the species was nearing extinction in the wild. As part of an effort to rescue the species, in 2026 around 250 seedlings were planted at the Mahaka Katia Scientific Reserve by the Department of Conservation. The plants were grown at the Dunedin Botanic Garden in a project that took around two years to produce enough plants starting with a population of two plants sprouted from three seeds collected by the Garden.
