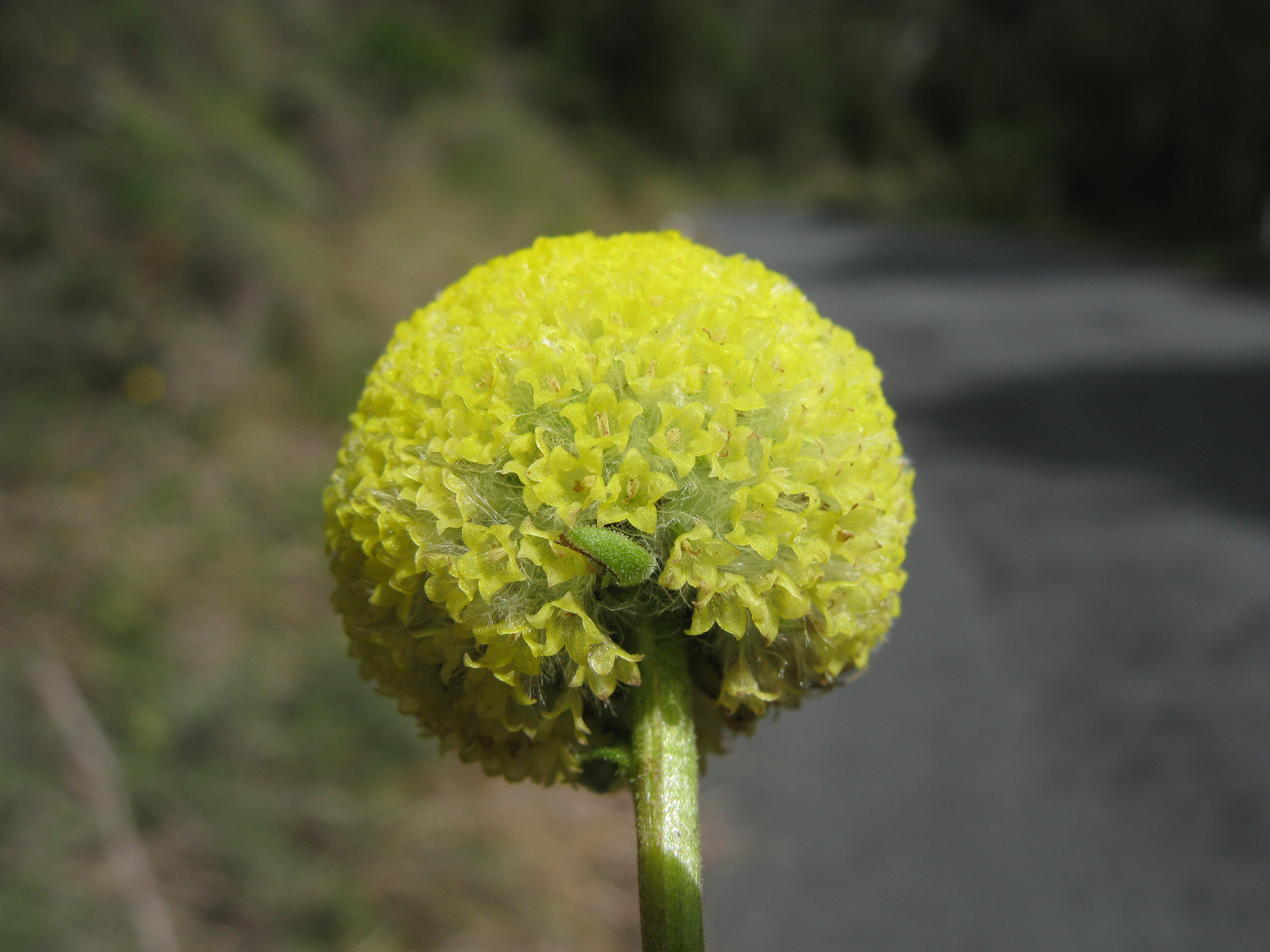

Scientific classification
- Kingdom: Plantae
- Clade: Tracheophytes
- Clade: Angiosperms
- Clade: Eudicots
- Clade: Asterids
- Order: Asterales
- Family: Asteraceae
- Genus: Craspedia
- Species: C. variabilis

Binomial name
- Craspedia variabilis J.Everett & Doust

= Craspedia variabilis =

Billy buttons

Species of flowering plant

Craspedia variabilis, commonly known as billy buttons, is an erect annual or perennial herb which occurs in all mainland states of Australia except for the Northern Territory and in a wide range of habitats in temperate zones but not in alpine areas.

== Description ==
Craspedia variabilis grows to a height of 10–60 cm, with one to five flower spikes surrounded by a rosette of leaves, with more leaves scattered along the flower spike. Each leaf is spoon-shaped, about 5–13 cm long and 5–20 mm wide. The leaves are pale to olive-green and the flower spike straw-coloured to reddish and both leaves and flower spike are hairy. It has thick, spreading woolly roots and broad, reddish, overlapping leaf-bases which are retained at the base of the flower spike. The flowers, which appear from early spring to early summer, form a hemispherical head of about 40-100 small, golden-yellow individual small flowers, each with a short stalk.

== Taxonomy and naming ==
Following a review of the genus Craspedia, Joy Everett and Andrew Doust named C. variabilis as a new species, along with C. paludicola, C. canens and C. haplorrhiza. They describe C. variabilis as "a complex species with several forms, some of which may be separable on further work". The specific epithet (variabilis) refers to the number of different forms across its wide distribution.

== Distribution and habitat ==
Craspedia variabilis is found in a wide variety of habitats but never alpine. In Western Australia it grows on seasonally wet flats, granite outcrops, slopes and in the Sydney region its distribution is described as "widespread in open forests and grassland".

== Use in horticulture ==
Billy buttons can be propagated from seed and grown in full sun. It grows in any soil provided that it is not too wet. It can be treated as an annual and used effectively as a single specimen or as a massed bedding plant.
