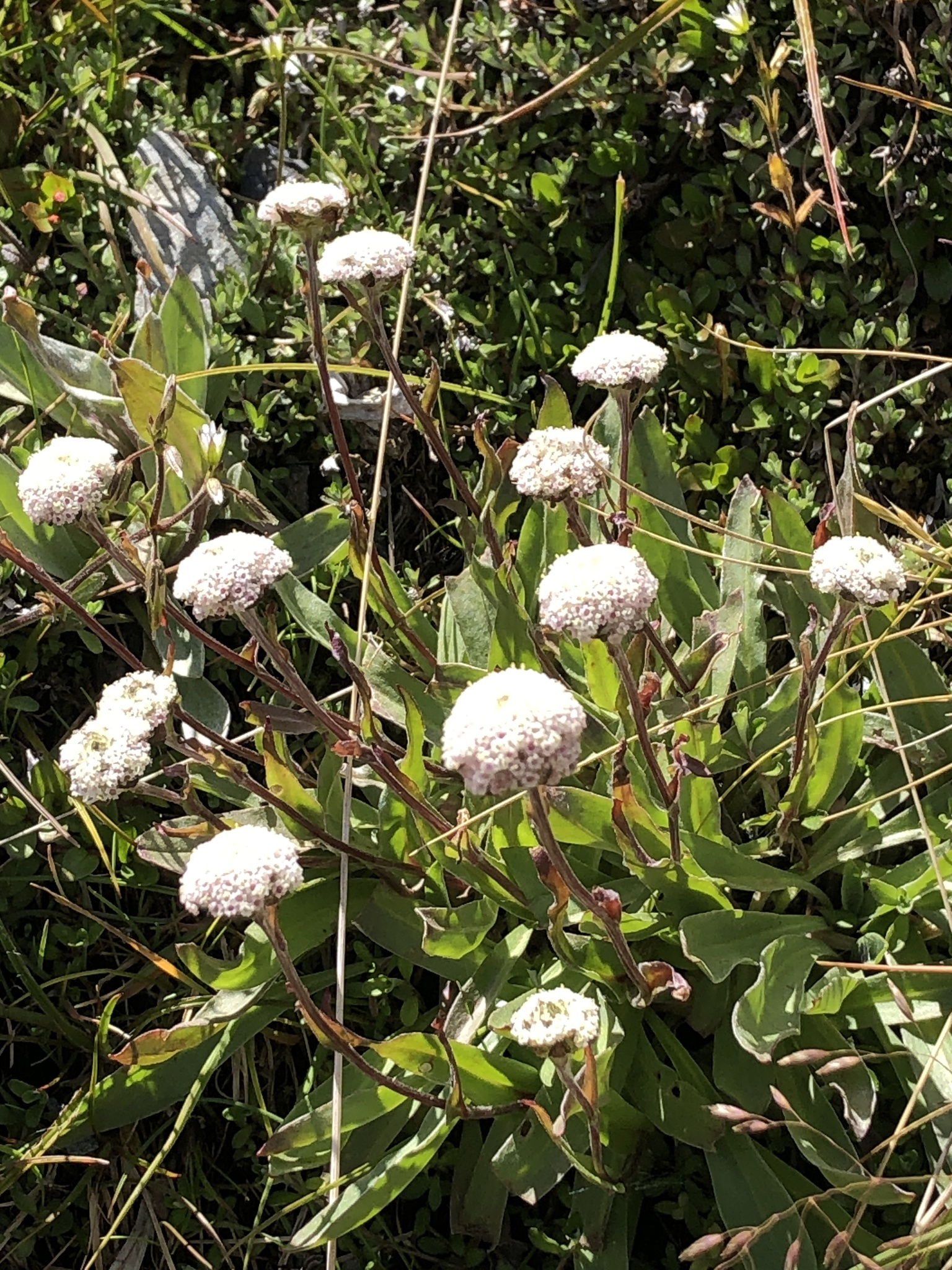
- Craspedia uniflora in Nelson Lakes National Park

Conservation status
- Nationally Endangered (NZ TCS)

Scientific classification
- Kingdom: Plantae
- Clade: Embryophytes
- Clade: Tracheophytes
- Clade: Angiosperms
- Clade: Eudicots
- Clade: Asterids
- Order: Asterales
- Family: Asteraceae
- Genus: Craspedia
- Species: C. uniflora

Binomial name
- Craspedia uniflora G.Forst.

= Craspedia uniflora =

Species of flowering plant

Craspedia uniflora, or woollyhead, is a species of Craspedia endemic to New Zealand.

== Description ==
Craspedia uniflora is a small flower with a white head with many small flower clusters together, making the impression of a single flower for each plant. The leaves are green and gray and a few inches long, and spread out from the stem like a typical Asteraceae.

== Range ==
Craspedia uniflora is endemic to New Zealand.

== Habitat ==
Lowland to subalpine environments, often grassland.

== Etymology ==
uniflora means 'one flower' in Latin.

== Taxonomy ==
Craspedia uniflora contains the following varieties:

- Craspedia uniflora var. grandis
- Craspedia uniflora var. maritima
- Craspedia uniflora var. subhispida
- Craspedia uniflora var. uniflora

Previously, it was considered that this Craspedia was also present in Australia, which is not the case.

== Conservation ==
Craspedia uniflora is Nationally Endangered, with the qualifiers DPR (Data Poor Recognition), DPS (Data Poor Size), DPT (Data Poor Trend), and PF (Population Fragmentation).
