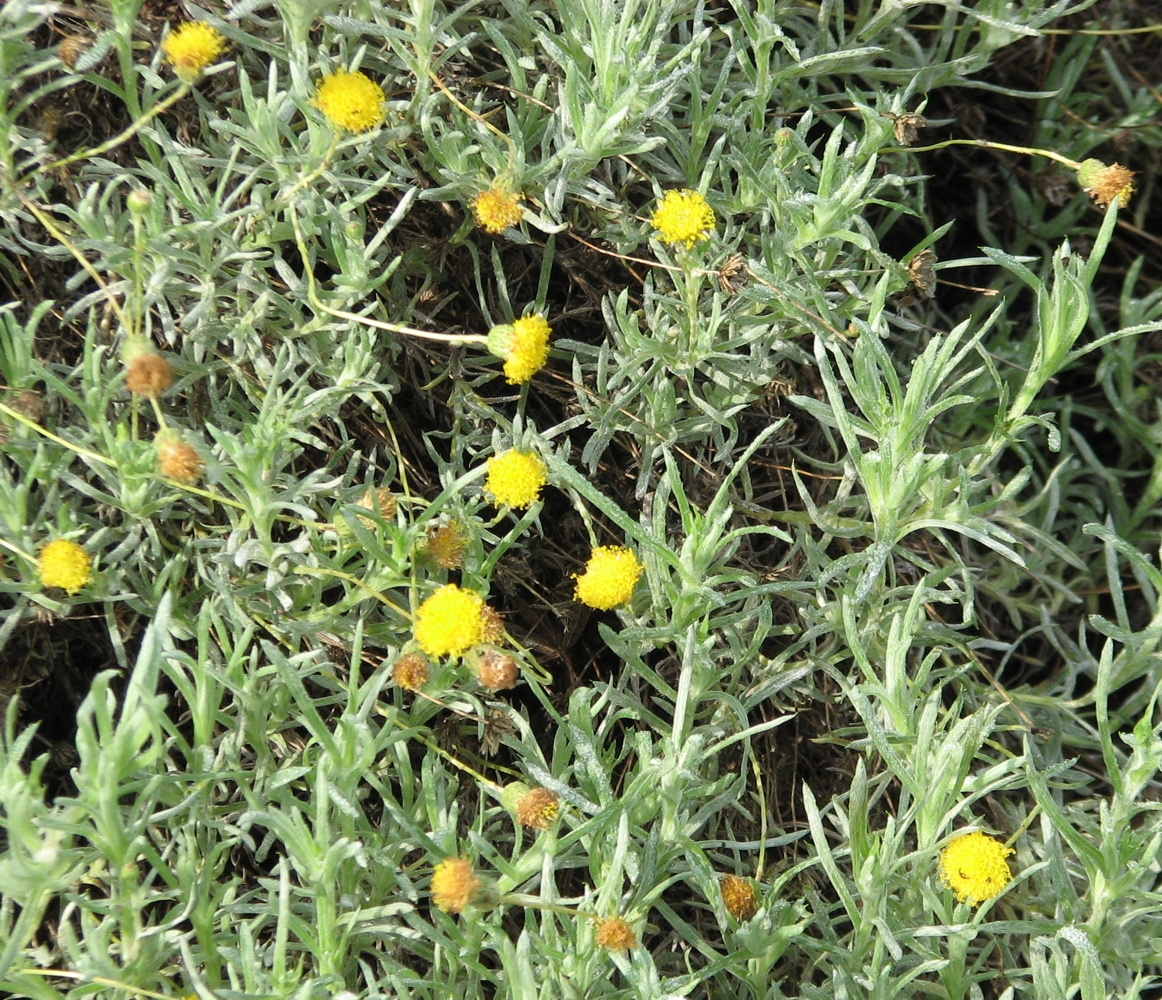
- Leiocarpa panaetioides

Scientific classification
- Kingdom: Plantae
- Clade: Tracheophytes
- Clade: Angiosperms
- Clade: Eudicots
- Clade: Asterids
- Order: Asterales
- Family: Asteraceae
- Subfamily: Asteroideae
- Tribe: Gnaphalieae
- Genus: Leiocarpa; Paul G.Wilson

= Leiocarpa =

Genus of flowering plants

Leiocarpa is a genus of plants in the family Asteraceae, native to Australia.

Species

- Leiocarpa brevicompta (F.Muell.) Paul G.Wilson - flat Billy-buttons
- Leiocarpa gatesii (H.B.Will.) Paul G.Wilson
- Leiocarpa leptolepis (DC.) Paul G.Wilson - pale plover-daisy
- Leiocarpa panaetioides (DC.) Paul G.Wilson - Woolly buttons
- Leiocarpa pluriseta (Haegi) Paul G. Wilson
- Leiocarpa semicalva (F.Muell.) Paul G.Wilson
- Leiocarpa serpens (J.Everett) Paul G.Wilson
- Leiocarpa supina (F.Muell.) Paul G.Wilson
- Leiocarpa tomentosa (Sond.) Paul G.Wilson - woolly plover-daisy
- Leiocarpa websteri (S.Moore) Paul G.Wilson
