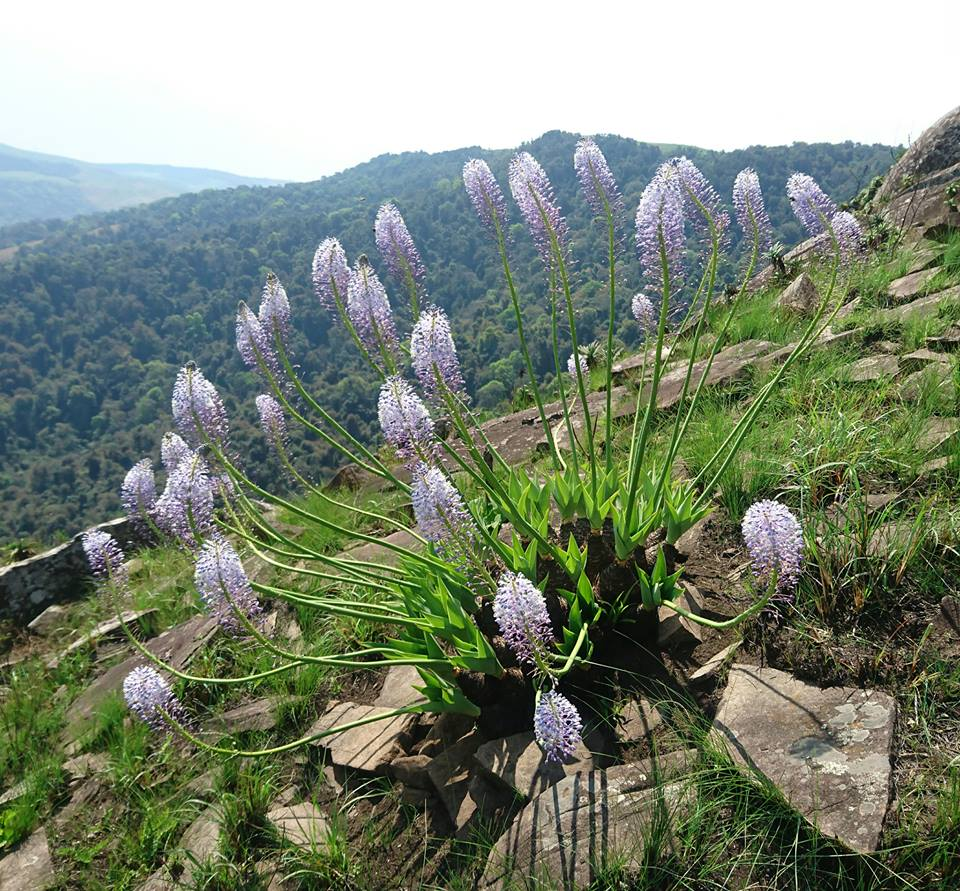

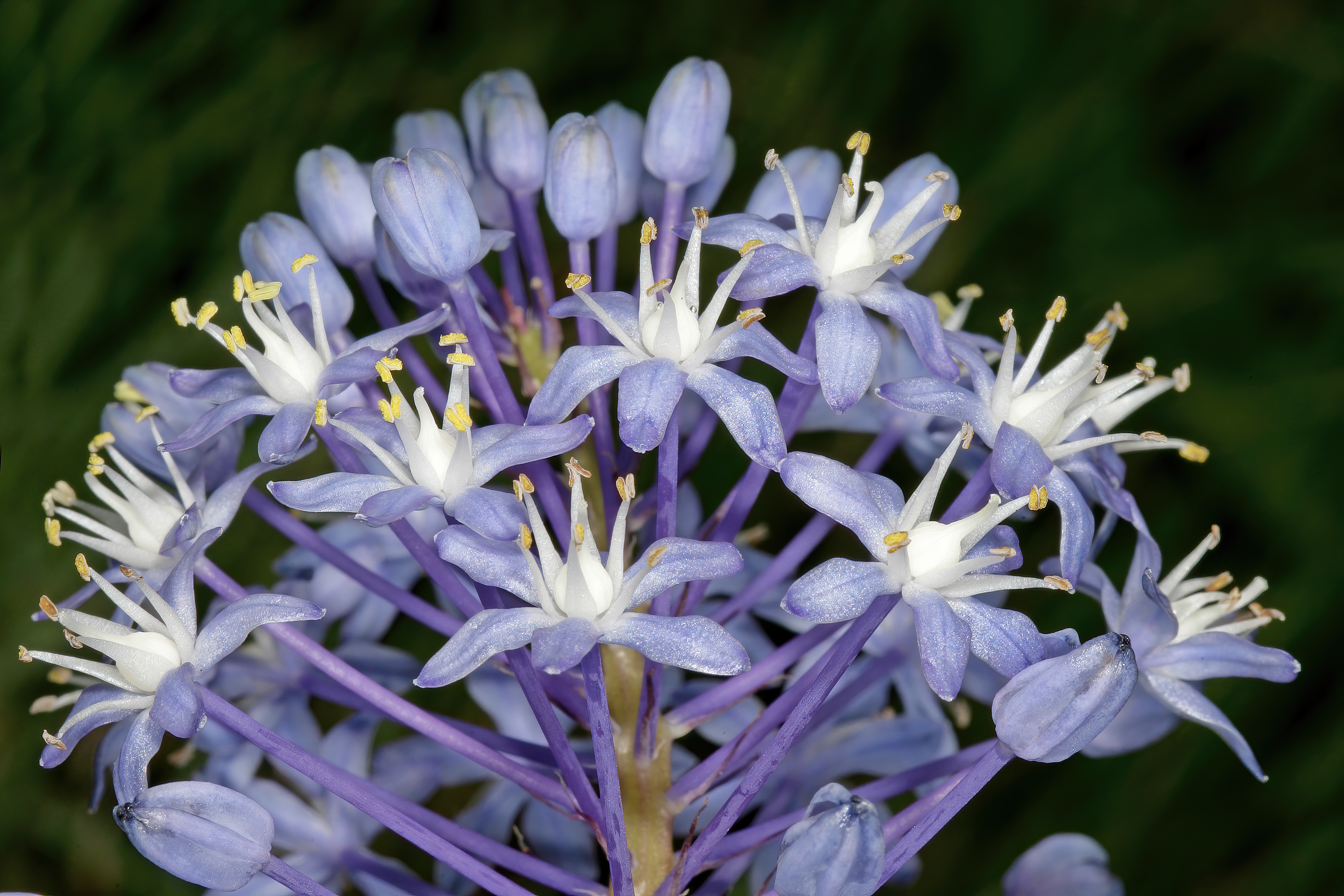

Conservation status
- Near Threatened (SANBI Red List)

Scientific classification
- Kingdom: Plantae
- Clade: Embryophytes
- Clade: Tracheophytes
- Clade: Spermatophytes
- Clade: Angiosperms
- Clade: Monocots
- Order: Asparagales
- Family: Asparagaceae
- Subfamily: Scilloideae
- Genus: Merwilla
- Species: M. plumbea

Binomial name
- Merwilla plumbea (Lindl.) Speta

= Merwilla plumbea =

Species of flowering plant

Merwilla plumbea, also known as the blue squill, is a perennial, bulb-forming herb in the small genus Merwilla of the family Asparagaceae. It is endemic to the Drakensberg.

== Distribution ==
Merwilla plumbea is found in the eastern part of South Africa, in Eswatini and Lesotho.

== Habitat ==
Merwilla plumbea is found on rocky, well-drained slopes at altitudes between 300-2500 metres.

== Ecology ==
Mature individuals are thought to live, on average, for 25 years.

== Conservation status ==
Merwilla plumbea has been assessed as near threatened due to a 25% decline in the local population from intensive poaching of the bulbs in the wild. In 2006, 1 851 580 bulbs in the Warwick Muti Market and 235 872 bulbs were sold in the Faraday Muti Market.

== Taxonomy ==
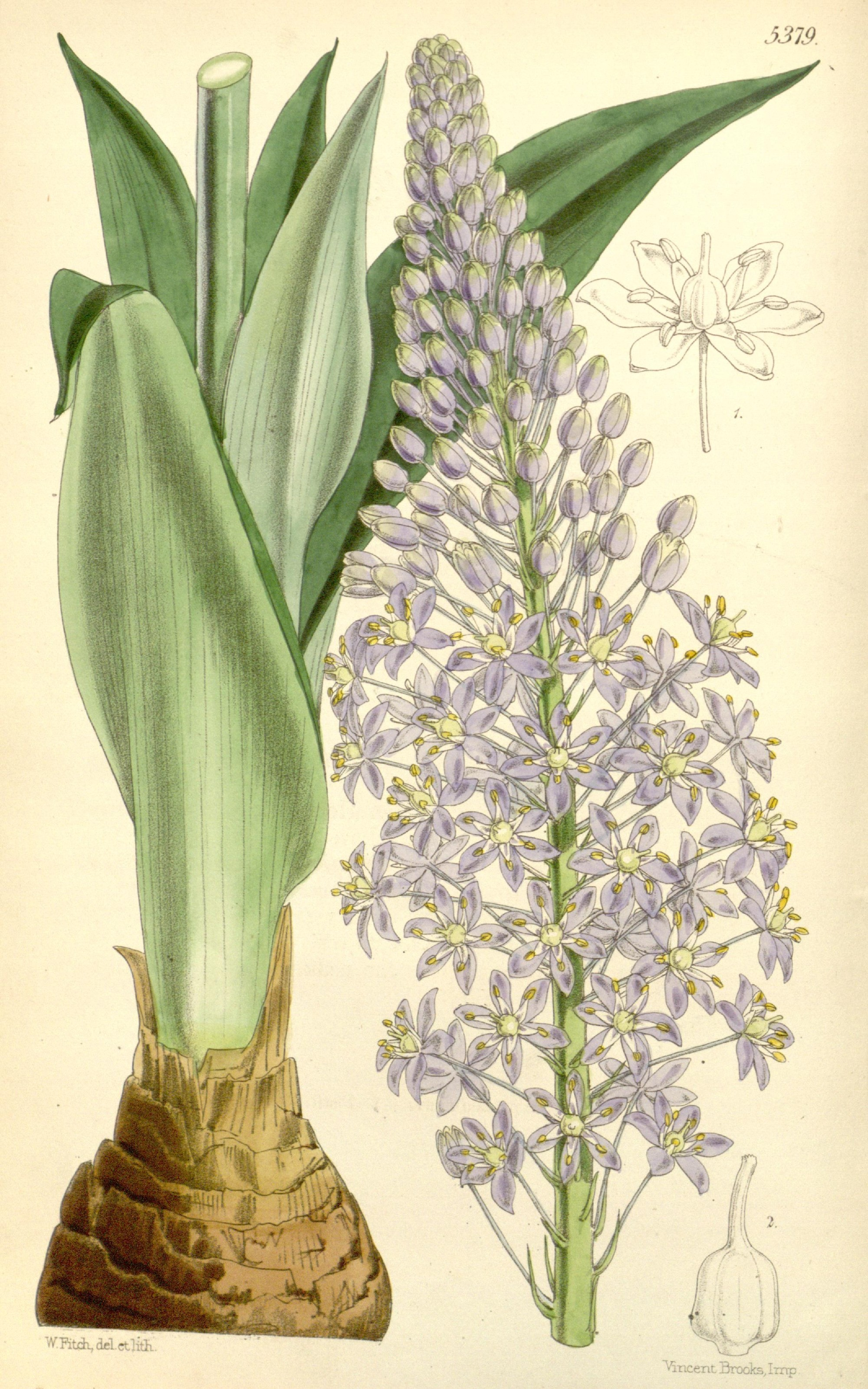
Illustration showing plant details.

Two subspecies are recognised:

- Merwilla plumbea subsp. kraussii (Baker) J.C.Manning, syn. Scilla kraussii
- Merwilla plumbea subsp. plumbea, syn. Scilla natalensis

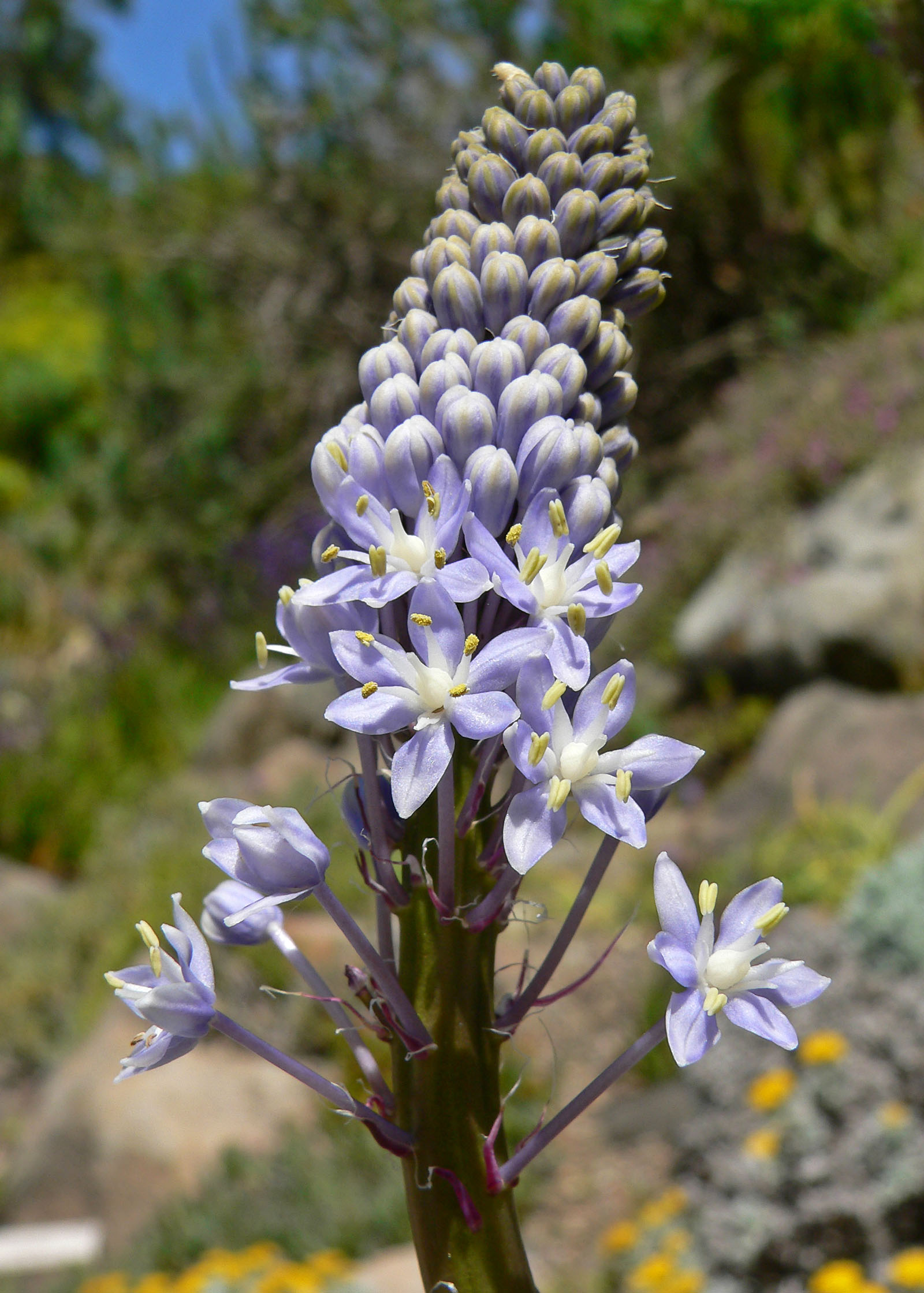
M. plumbea subsp. plumbea flowers
