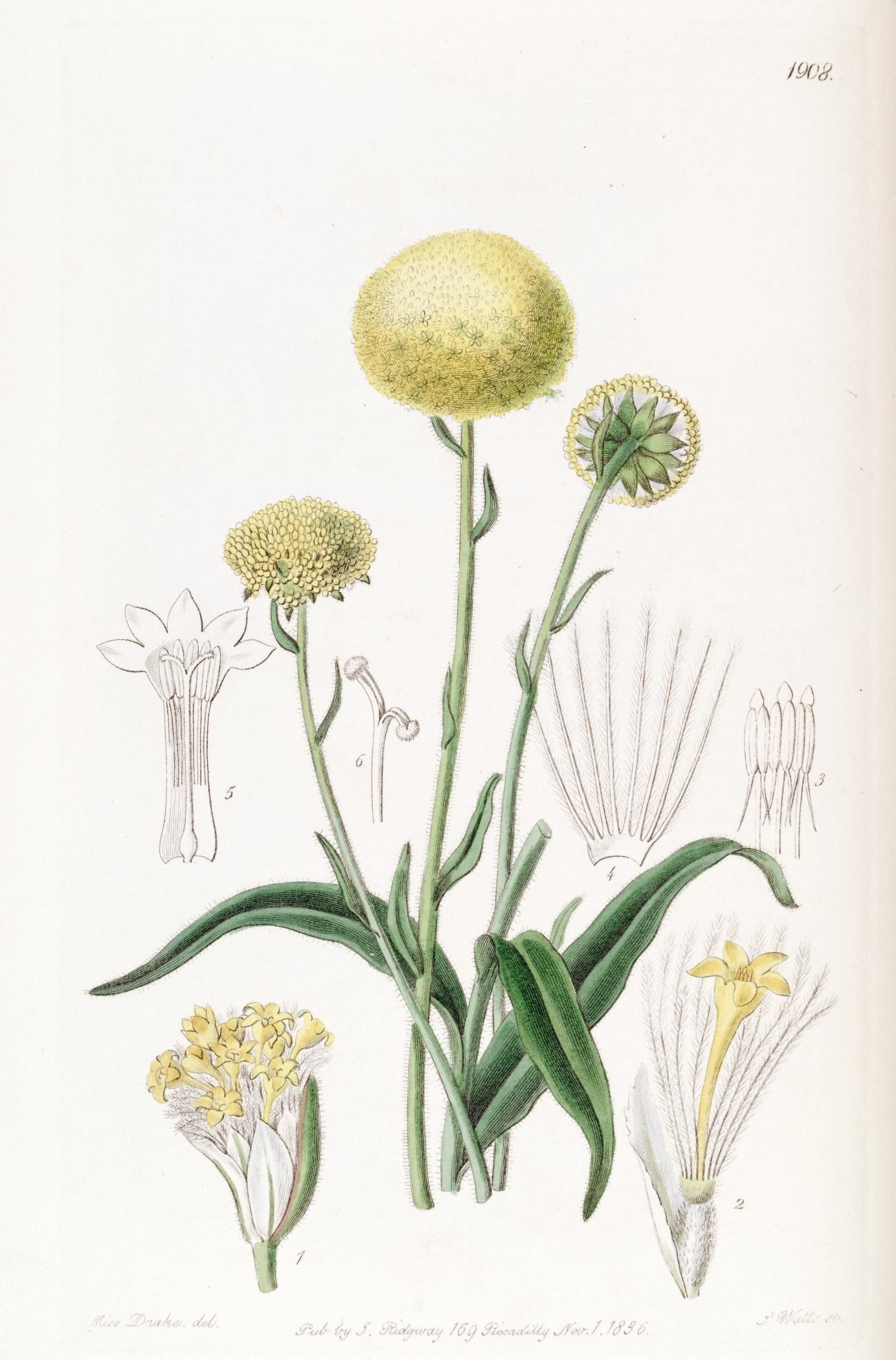

Scientific classification
- Kingdom: Plantae
- Clade: Tracheophytes
- Clade: Angiosperms
- Clade: Eudicots
- Clade: Asterids
- Order: Asterales
- Family: Asteraceae
- Genus: Craspedia
- Species: C. glauca

Binomial name
- Craspedia glauca (Labill.) Spreng.

= Craspedia glauca =

Billy buttons

Species of flowering plant

Craspedia glauca, commonly known as billy buttons, is an erect annual or perennial herb endemic to Tasmania. It is usually an annual herb with pale green leaves in a rosette and yellow button-like flowers on a tall stem.

== Description ==
Craspedia glauca is an annual or perennial herb of varying form and habitat, mostly with yellow "button" flowers on a tall stem 10–80 cm (3.9–31.5 in) high. The lower leaves are green, oblong to oblong-lance shaped, 4–20 cm (1.6–7.9 in) long, 6–18 mm (0.24–0.71 in) wide, narrowing gradually and forming a rosette at the base of the stem.
