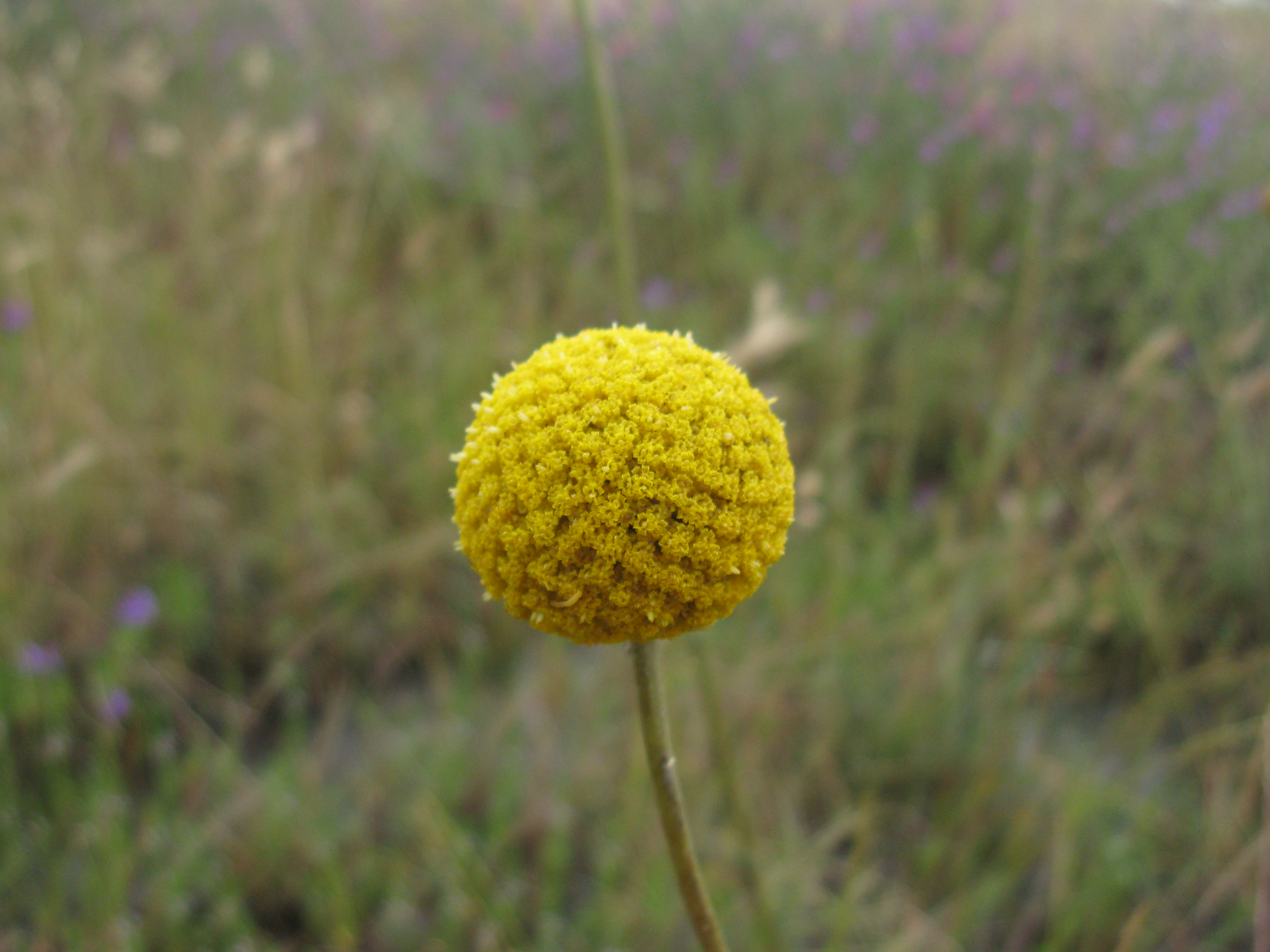
- Pycnosorus globosus

Scientific classification
- Kingdom: Plantae
- Clade: Tracheophytes
- Clade: Angiosperms
- Clade: Eudicots
- Clade: Asterids
- Order: Asterales
- Family: Asteraceae
- Subfamily: Asteroideae
- Tribe: Gnaphalieae
- Genus: Pycnosorus; Benth.

= Pycnosorus =

Genus of plants

Pycnosorus is a genus of six species of plants in the family Asteraceae. Commonly known as billy buttons or drumsticks, they are annual or perennial herbs or small shrubs with a cylindrical to spherical head of up to 200 daisy-like "flowers". Each "flower" is a pseudanthium consisting of between three and eight florets surrounded by bracts. The petals are joined to form a small tube and the florets with their surrounding bracts are yellow or golden-yellow.

== Description ==
Plants in the genus Pycnosorus are annual or perennial herbs, with leaves decreasing in size up the stem, those at the base withering first. The flowers are arranged in oval to more or less spherical heads of 40 to 200 flower-like partial heads. Each partial head consists of three to eight small flower-like "florets". The florets and the bracts which surround them are yellow or golden in colour. Each flower has five petals joined to form a tube. After pollination the flowers become silky achenes with a ring of feathery bristles.

Plants in the closely related genus Craspedia are also known by the common name "billy buttons" but have their flowers on small stalks rather than attached directly to the receptacle ("sessile") as in Pycnosorus. There is some evidence that the two genera may in fact be monophyletic.

== Taxonomy and naming ==
The genus was first formally described in 1837 by George Bentham and the description was published in Enumeratio plantarum quas in Novae Hollandiæ ora austro-occidentali ad fluvium Cygnorum et in sinu Regis Georgii collegit Carolus Liber Baro de Hügel . Bentham nominated Pycnosorus globosus as the type species. The genus name (Pycnosaurus) is derived from the Ancient Greek words pyknos meaning "dense" or "thick" and soros meaning "heap".

The following is a list of species of Pycnosorus accepted by the Australian Plant Census as at 30 November 2019:

- Pycnosorus chrysanthus (Schldl.) Sond. – golden billy-buttons
- Pycnosorus eremaeus J.Everett & Doust
- Pycnosorus globosus (F.Muell.) Benth – drumsticks
- Pycnosorus melleus J.Everett & Doust
- Pycnosorus pleiocephalus (F.Muell.) J.Everett & Doust – soft billy-buttons
- Pycnosorus thompsonianus J.Everett & Doust

== Distribution and habitat ==
All six species of Pycnosorus are endemic to Australia and there are species in all states except Tasmania. Most species grow in heavy, often rocky soils.
