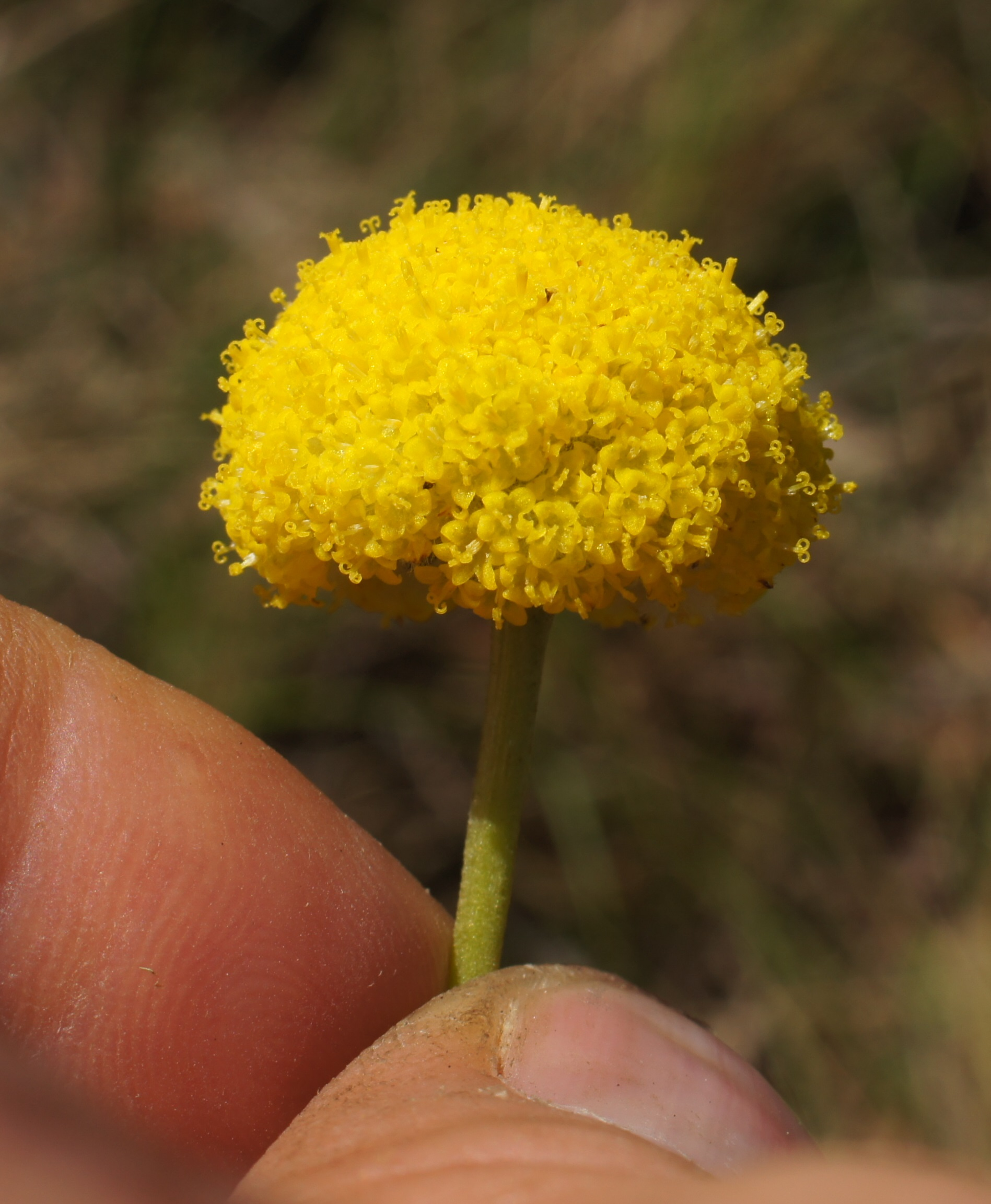
- Craspedia canens

Scientific classification
- Kingdom: Plantae
- Clade: Embryophytes
- Clade: Tracheophytes
- Clade: Angiosperms
- Clade: Eudicots
- Clade: Asterids
- Order: Asterales
- Family: Asteraceae
- Subfamily: Asteroideae
- Tribe: Gnaphalieae
- Genus: Craspedia; G.Forst.

Type species
- Craspedia uniflora G.Forst.

Species
- see list

Diversity
- About 20 species

Synonyms
- Cartodium Sol. ex R.Br.; Richea Labill. 1800 rejected name not R.Br. 1810 (Ericaceae) nor Kuntze 1891 (Rhizophoraceae)

= Craspedia (plant) =

Genus of Australasian flowering plants

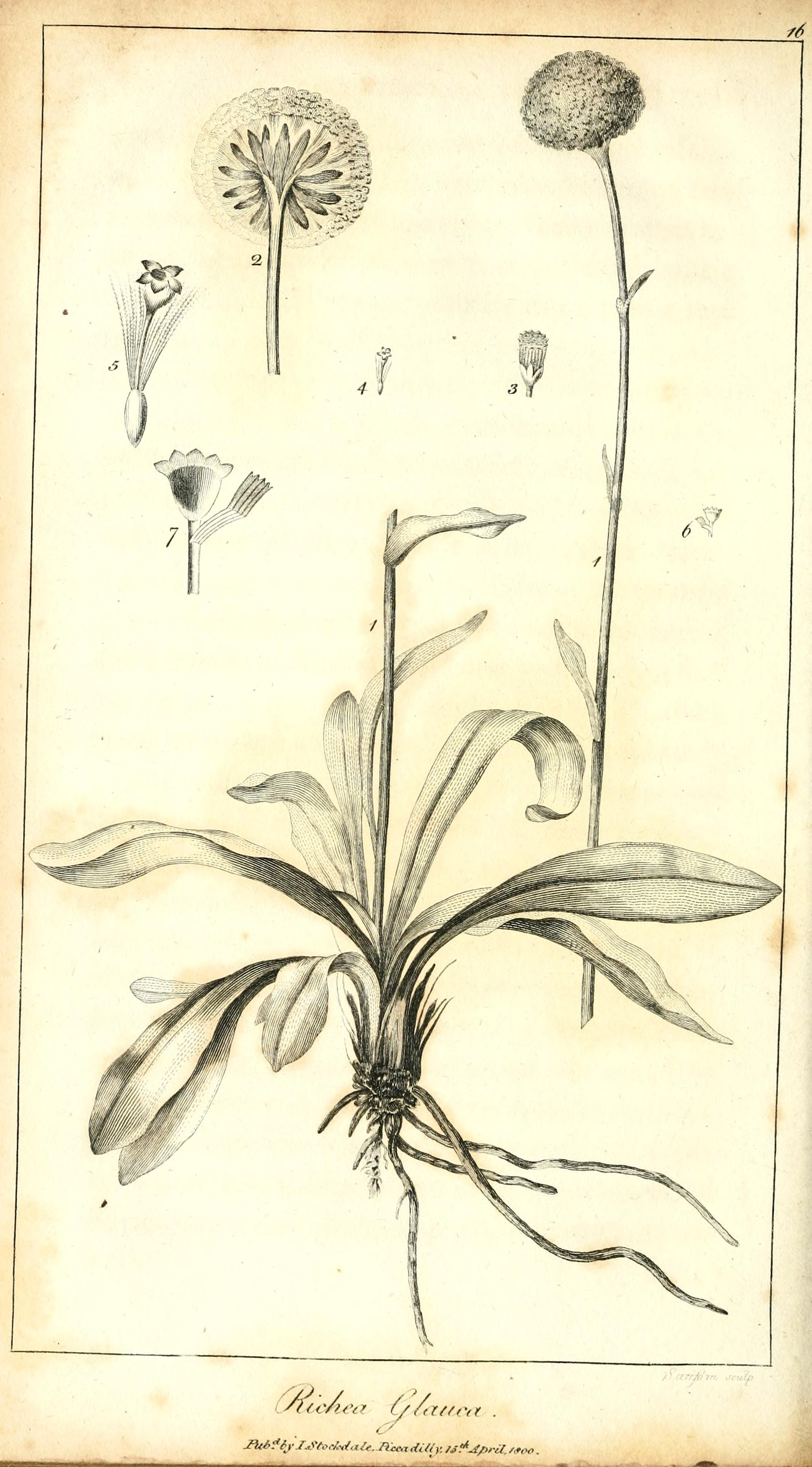
Botanical illustration (1800)

Craspedia is a genus of flowering plants in the family Asteraceae commonly known as billy buttons, billy balls, and woollyheads. They are native to Australia and New Zealand where they grow in a variety of habitats from sea level to the Southern Alps. The genus is found in every state of Australia but not in the Northern Territory. In New Zealand, Craspedia is found from East Cape on the North Island south to Stewart Island. It also occurs on Campbell Island and the Chatham Islands.

== Description ==
Craspedia are rosette-forming herbs with compound capitula borne on erect, unbranched scapes. The capitula are hemispherical to spherical heads of tiny flowers. Most species are perennial; one species is recorded as an annual (Craspedia haplorrhiza). The leaves have considerable variation in form, ranging in colour from white to green, and are often covered in fine hairs.

A closely related genus is Pycnosorus, also often called billy buttons. The genera can be distinguished by the attachment of individual flower heads to the compound heads; in Pycnosorus they are directly attached, and in Craspedia they arise on small stalks. The two genera may actually be monophyletic.

== Taxonomy ==
The genus Craspedia was first described by Johann Georg Adam Forster in 1786. It is placed within the family Asteraceae, tribe Gnaphalieae, with about 23 species. The original description included only one species, Craspedia uniflora. Early authors included Pycnosorus, which was later segregated. Molecular phylogeny suggested the two genera were sister clades, but there is some evidence that the two genera may in fact be monophyletic.

=== Species ===
The following species are recognised in the genus Craspedia:

- Craspedia adenophora K.L.McDougall & N.G.Walsh
- Craspedia alba J.Everett & Joy Thomps.
- Craspedia argentea Breitw. & K.A.Ford
- Craspedia aurantia J.Everett & Joy Thomps.
- Craspedia basaltica J.Everett ex N.G.Walsh
- Craspedia canens J.Everett & Doust
- Craspedia costiniana J.Everett & Joy Thomps.
- Craspedia crocata J.Everett & Joy Thomps.
- Craspedia cynurica Rozefelds & A.M.Buchanan
- Craspedia diversicolor Breitw. & K.A.Ford
- Craspedia glabrata (Hook.f.) Rozefelds
- Craspedia glauca (Labill.) Spreng.
- Craspedia gracilis Hook.f.
- Craspedia haplorrhiza J.Everett & Doust
- Craspedia huriawa Breitw. & Courtney
- Craspedia incana Cockayne & Allan
- Craspedia lamicola J.Everett & Joy Thomps.
- Craspedia lanata (Hook.f.) Allan
- Craspedia leucantha F.Muell.
- Craspedia macrocephala Hook.
- Craspedia major (Hook.f.) Allan
- Craspedia maxgrayi J.Everett & Joy Thomps.
- Craspedia minor (Hook.f.) Allan
- Craspedia paludicola J.Everett & Doust
- Craspedia preminghana Rozefelds
- Craspedia robusta (Hook.f.) Cockayne
- Craspedia rosulata Rozefelds & A.M.Buchanan
- Craspedia rugosa Breitw. & K.A.Ford
- Craspedia sylvestris J.Everett ex N.G.Walsh
- Craspedia thinicola Breitw. & K.A.Ford
- Craspedia uniflora G.Forst.
- Craspedia variabilis J.Everett & Doust

=== Etymology ===
The genus is named for the Greek Kraspedon, meaning an edge, hem or border, because of the woolly fringes of the leaves belonging to the type species.

== Biogeography and evolution ==
There are two centres of diversity in Craspedia, both associated with upland areas. One of these is in the alpine and subalpine zone of Kosciuszko National Park in Australia, where seven species are found. The other centre is a larger area on the northwestern South Island of New Zealand, where several species grow.

== Ecology ==
Species of Craspedia are found in a wide range of habitats from coastal to alpine and are generally plants of open areas, sometimes ruderal. Observations of some Australian species suggest they re-establish well after fire. In Australia Craspedia are commonly found growing in forest habitat, whereas in New Zealand they are generally excluded from closed Nothofagus forests. Craspedia species may occur in dense, widespread populations in mainland Australia, but generally not in New Zealand or Tasmania. Most Australian non-alpine species are found in native grasslands and shrublands associated with Eucalyptus forests. Alpine species occur in Tasmania. In New Zealand, species can be found on coastal sand dunes, wetlands, fellfields, and greywacke rock scree.

Craspedia grow in a wide range of soil types, including sands, gravels, clays, and loams, which are derived from different geologies across a broad rainfall gradient. They appear to be intolerant only of very infertile and acidic soils. This is apparent in the absence of Craspedia from parts of western Tasmania which are characterised by soils derived from pre-Cambrian quartzose rock. These sandy, infertile soils are dominated by a wet heath ecosystem known as buttongrass moorland.

== Cultivation ==
Craspedia is hardy to USDA zones 9–11. It can be propagated by cutting a rosette from a clump, but generally seed is a more reliable and rapid method. Seeds will sprout in days on germination media. Plants are generally self-fertile. The alpine species need regular water and excellent drainage. All species prefer cool roots; surrounding the plants with rock, gravel, or sand provides better conditions. A plant will start growing as a single rosette, and each rosette generally produces one flower stalk. Cultivars include 'Golf Beauty'.

== Uses ==
Craspedia is grown both as an ornamental garden plant, and floriculture for cut flowers and floral arrangements, including dried flowers. Africa is a source of exports.

== Bibliography ==
=== Articles and books ===
- Ford, Kerry A.; Ward, Josephine M.; Smissen, Rob D.; Wagstaff, Steven J.; Breitwieser, Ilse (August 2007). "Phylogeny and Biogeography of Craspedia (Asteraceae: Gnaphalieae) Based on ITS, ETS and psbA-trnH Sequence Data". Taxon. 56 (3): 783–794. doi:10.2307/25065861. JSTOR 25065861.
- Forster, Johann Georg Adam (1786). "Craspedia". Florulae insularum Australium: prodromus (Fl.Ins.Austr.). Gottingae: Joann. Christian Dietrich. p. 58.
- Rozefelds, Andrew C.; Buchanan, Alex M.; Ford, Kerry A. (June 2011). "New Species Of Craspedia (Asteraceae: Gnaphalieae) From Tasmania And Determination Of The Identity Of C. Macrocephala Hook" (PDF). Kanunnah. 4: 93–116.
- Schmidt-Lebuhn, Alexander N. (2013). "Reciprocal monophyly of Craspedia and Pycnosorus (Asteraceae, Gnaphalieae) and the problems of using ribosomal DNA at the lowest taxonomic levels". Australian Systematic Botany. 26 (3): 233. doi:10.1071/SB13018. S2CID 86848978.
- Schmidt-Lebuhn, Alexander N.; Milner, Kirsty V. (2013). "A quantitative study of morphology in Australian Craspedia (Asteraceae, Gnaphalieae)". Australian Systematic Botany. 26 (3): 238. doi:10.1071/SB13017. S2CID 86308341.

=== Websites ===
- "How to Grow Craspedia - Growing Billy Buttons". Balcony Garden Web. 21 October 2015.
- Sparks, Brian (9 January 2017). "Growing Tips for Craspedia 'Golf Beauty'". Greenhouse Grower.
- "Craspedia Forster f." Cut Flower Exports of Africa. USDA. September 5, 2007.
- The Shade Gardener (12 February 2017). "Craspedia 'Golf Beauty'". Gardening in the Shade.
- Delhaye, Céline (1 August 2018). "Craspedia". Gerbeaud (in French). Société Nationale d'Horticulture de France.
- "Craspedia". Flowers & Plants. Interflora.

Databases

- "Craspedia". Vascular Plants: Australian Plant Name Index (APNI) APC. Council of Heads of Australasian Herbaria.
- TPL (2013). "Craspedia". The Plant List Version 1.1. Royal Botanic Gardens, Kew and Missouri Botanical Garden.
- Flann, C, ed. (2009). "Craspedia G.Forst". Global Compositae Checklist. Landcare Research, New Zealand.
- Tropicos (2019). "Craspedia G. Forst". Missouri Botanical Garden.
- "Craspedia". Seeds of South Australia. Botanic Gardens of South Australia. 2018.

Flora

- Everett, J.; Doust, A. N. L. "Genus Craspedia". PlantNET FloraOnline. Royal Botanic Gardens, Sydney.
- "Craspedia G.Forst". Florabase: the Western Australian flora. Western Australian Herbarium.
- Everett, J. (1999). "Craspedia". Vicflora: Flora of Victoria. Royal Botanic Gardens, Melbourne.
