= Allan Herbarium =

Herbarium in Lincoln, New Zealand

The Allan Herbarium
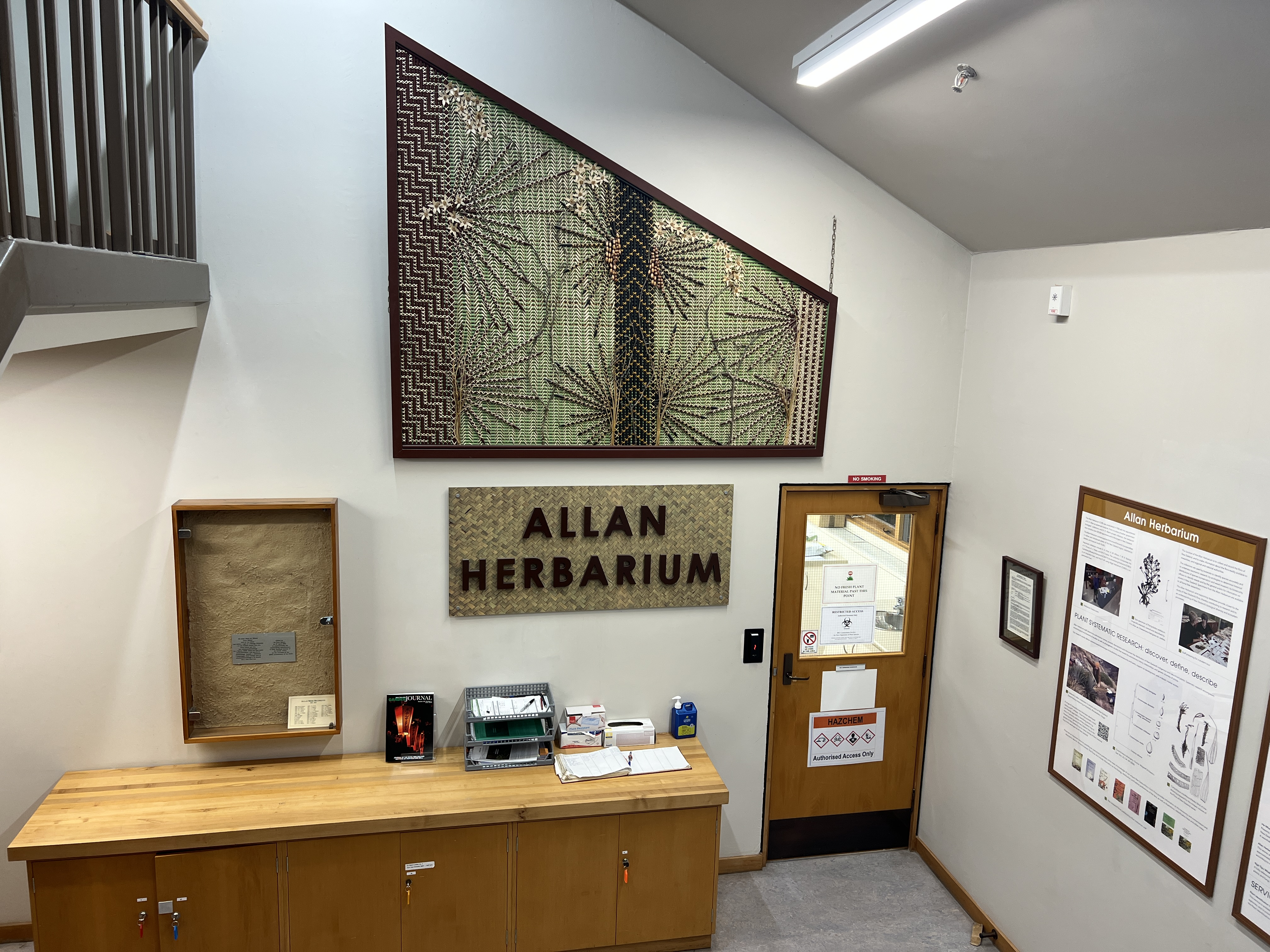
- Entry to the Allan Herbarium
- Established: 1928
- Address: Landcare Research, Gerald Street, Lincoln 7640, Canterbury, New Zealand
- Location: Lincoln, New Zealand, New Zealand
- Coordinates: 43°38′28″S 172°28′41″E
- Interactive map of The Allan Herbarium
- Website: Allan Herbarium – Te Kohinga Tipu o Aotearoa

The Allan Herbarium is the largest herbarium in New Zealand, with over 800,000 specimens. Its Index Herbariorum code is CHR.

== History of the herbarium ==
The herbarium was founded in 1928 when the systematic botanist H.H. Allan was appointed at the Plant Research Station in Palmerston North. His private collection as well as specimens from the old Biological Laboratory, Department of Agriculture made up the beginnings of the collection.

== Significant collections ==
Significant collections held by CHR include:

- Banks & Solander (including some duplicates from Cook's first voyage, 1769-70)
