= A. globosa =

A. globosa may refer to:

- Aaptos globosa, a New Zealand sea sponge
- Acanthodoris globosa, a New Zealand sea slug
- Adenia globosa, an African shrub
- Afroguatteria globosa, an Angolan vine
- Allocasuarina globosa, an Australian shrub
- Alpinia globosa, commonly known as round Chinese cardamom, an East Asian plant
- Alvania globosa, a prehistoric sea snail
- Amastra globosa, a prehistoric land snail
- Ampullaria globosa, a synonym of Pila globosa, a freshwater snail
- Anisophyllea globosa, a Bornean tree
- Apteropeda globosa, a European flea beetle
