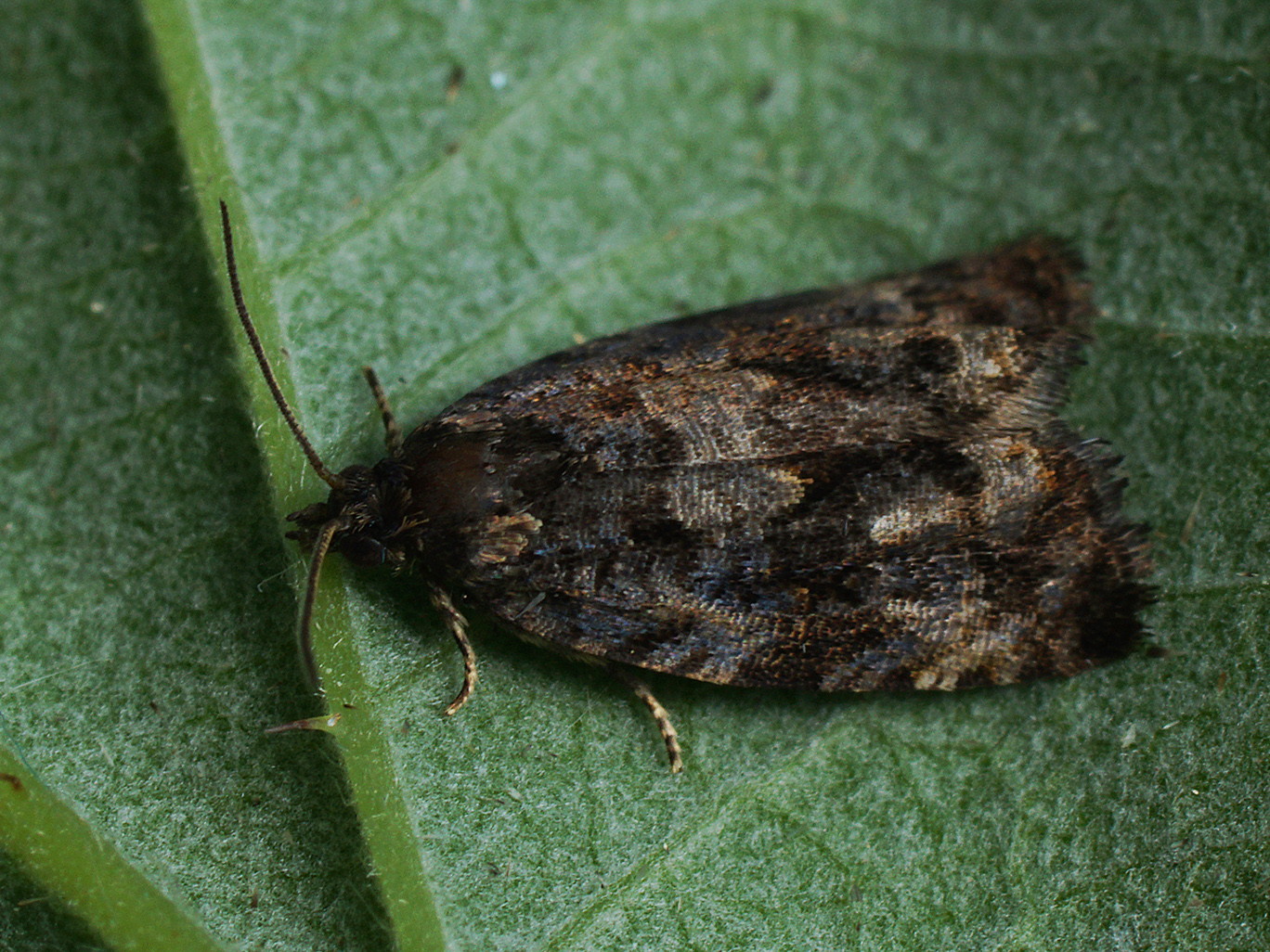

Scientific classification
- Domain: Eukaryota
- Kingdom: Animalia
- Phylum: Arthropoda
- Class: Insecta
- Order: Lepidoptera
- Family: Tortricidae
- Genus: Endothenia
- Species: E. ustulana

Binomial name
- Endothenia ustulana (Haworth, 1811)

= Endothenia ustulana =

Species of moth

Endothenia ustulana, the bugle marble, is a species of moth belonging to the family Tortricidae. It is native to Europe and across the Palearctic.

The wingspan is 10–12 mm (0.39–0.47 in). It is stocky, grey-brown moth and has no conspicuous colour shading. The forewings are grey-variegated with a blurry, bright cross-band near the wing tip. The hindwings are grey-brown. It flies in June and July and can be found in meadows and clearings in the forest during the day. The larvae feed on blue bugle (Ajuga reptans) and pyramidal bugle (Ajuga pyramidalis). At first they feed internally in the roots and in the following spring the later instars feed in the stalks of leaves.
