= Blue bugleweed =

Blue bugleweed is a common name for several plants and may refer to:

- Ajuga reptans, the common bugle
- Ajuga genevensis, the upright bugle
