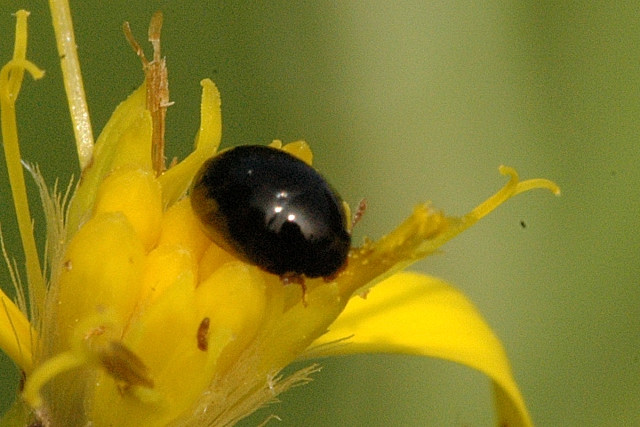

Scientific classification
- Kingdom: Animalia
- Phylum: Arthropoda
- Class: Insecta
- Order: Coleoptera
- Suborder: Polyphaga
- Infraorder: Cucujiformia
- Family: Chrysomelidae
- Genus: Apteropeda
- Species: A. orbiculata

Binomial name
- Apteropeda orbiculata (Marsham, 1802)

Synonyms
- Chrysomela orbiculata Marsham, 1802; Haltica graminis Koch, 1803; Haltica hederae Illiger, 1807; Altica cilliata Olivier, 1808; Apteropeda orbiculata var. aurichalcea Weise, 1893; Apteropeda orbiculata var. coerulans Weise, 1893

= Apteropeda orbiculata =

Species of beetle

Apteropeda orbiculata is a species of beetle in the Chrysomelidae family that can be found on the British Isles, Denmark, France, Germany, Northern Spain, the Netherlands, Western Poland and Western Ukraine. It is black coloured, but can also be green.

== Habitat ==
The species feeds on various plants, including Ajuga, Aster, Cirsium, Galeopsis, Linaria, Mullein, Plantago, Polyphagus, Primula, Rhinanthus, Scrophularia, Stachys, and Veronica species.
