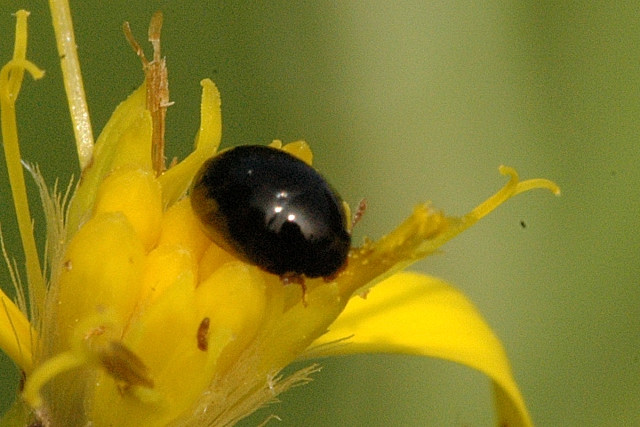
- Apteropeda orbiculata

Scientific classification
- Kingdom: Animalia
- Phylum: Arthropoda
- Class: Insecta
- Order: Coleoptera
- Suborder: Polyphaga
- Infraorder: Cucujiformia
- Family: Chrysomelidae
- Tribe: Alticini
- Genus: Apteropeda; Chevrolat in Dejean, 1836

Species
- Apteropeda globosa (Illiger, 1794); Apteropeda orbiculata (Marsham, 1802); Apteropeda ovulum (Illiger, 1807); Apteropeda splendida Allard, 1860

= Apteropeda =

Genus of beetles

Apteropeda is a genus of flea beetle in the family Chrysomelidae.
