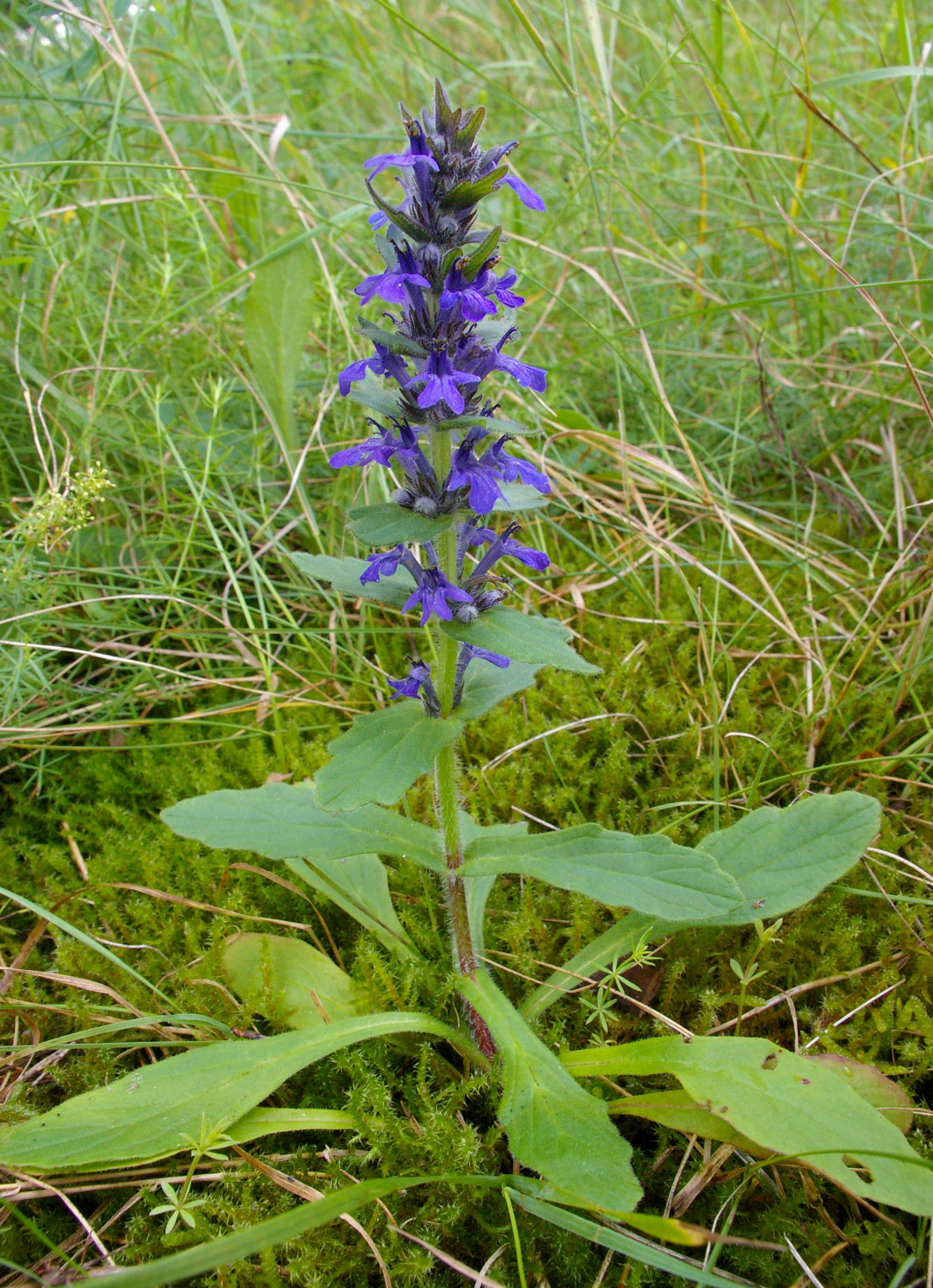

Scientific classification
- Kingdom: Plantae
- Clade: Tracheophytes
- Clade: Angiosperms
- Clade: Eudicots
- Clade: Asterids
- Order: Lamiales
- Family: Lamiaceae
- Genus: Ajuga
- Species: A. genevensis

Binomial name
- Ajuga genevensis L.

= Ajuga genevensis =

Species of flowering plant

A. genevensis (also variously known as the upright bugle, blue bugle, Geneva bugleweed, blue bugleweed) is a herbaceous flowering plant native to Europe. It is less common than its relative, Ajuga reptans (common bugle).

== Description ==
A. genevensis is a perennial plant (flowering between April and July) growing to a height of between 10 and 30 cm. Evergreen, it has long-stalked, obovate, basal leaves which are shallowly lobed or toothed.

It has an upright stem with flowers arranged in dense, terminal, spike-like inflorescences. The flowers are usually violet-blue, though can be pink or white, and the uppermost flowers are often flushed with blue. When pink, it is sometimes known as "pink beauty", and when white, it is sometimes known as "alba". The flowers have short upper-lips with protruding stamens and pistil. The plant sometimes suffers from Erysiphe biocellata, a type of mildew.

== Relatives ==
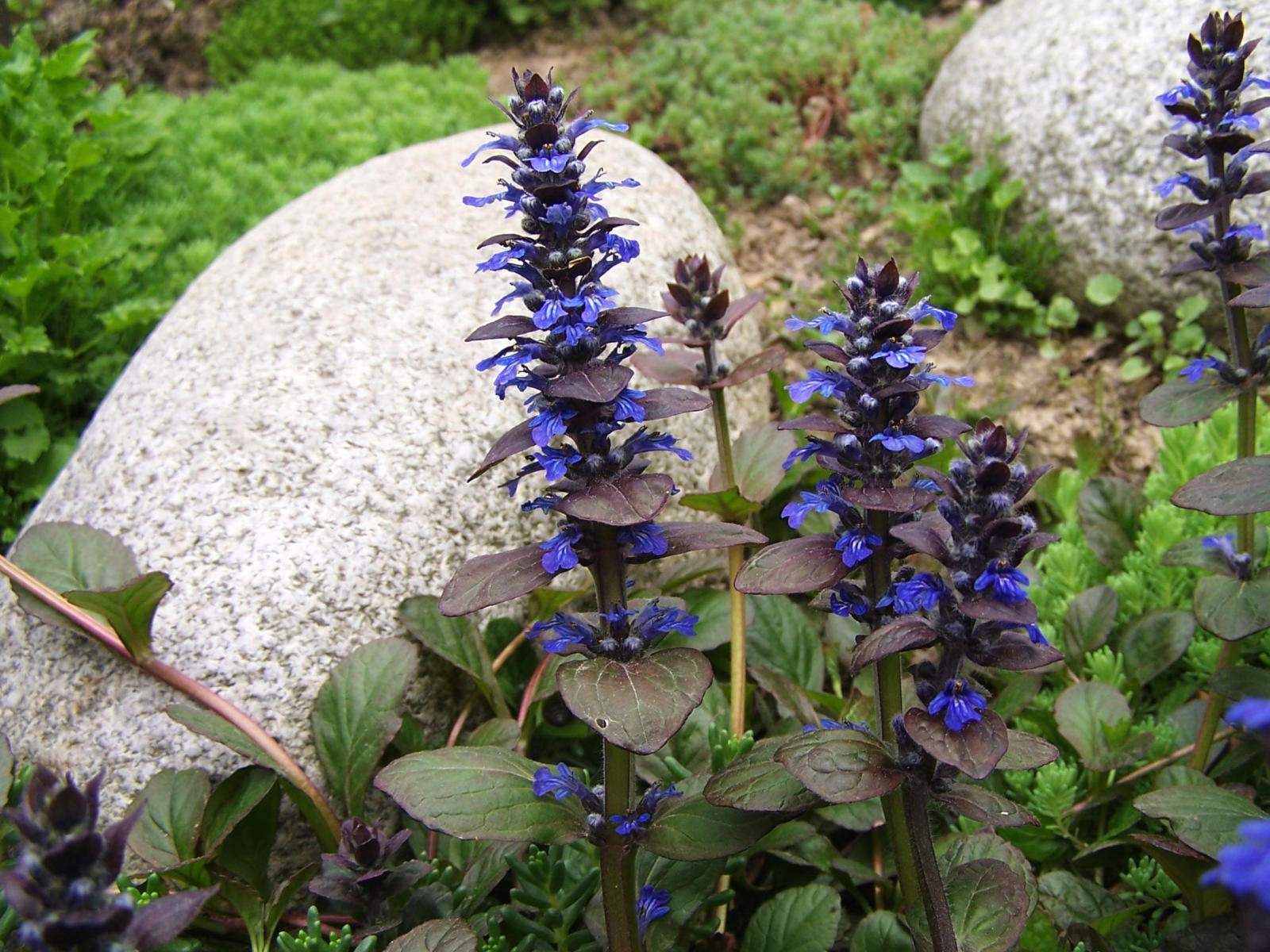
Ajuga reptans, a relative with which A. genevensis sometimes interbreeds.

A. genevensis is a less common relative of Ajuga reptans, the Common bugle, though it is common for the two plants to interbreed, as well as with Ajuga pyramidalis, the pyramidal bugle, producing hybrid offspring that are very similar.

=== Varieties ===
There are also several variants of A. genevensis such as A. genevensis var. arida (a variety with short grey hairs found in mountain meadows) and A. genevensis var. elatior (a mountain plant with randomly hairy stems). Both varieties vary slightly in the shape and size of the leaves and bracts.

== Distribution ==
A. genevensis is found on the edges of dry woods, as well as in thickets and grasslands. It is found in Europe (from France to western Russia), Turkey and the Caucasus. It is also naturalized in North America, as a result of seeds that have escaped from gardens. It is used as an ornamental plant in gardens worldwide, where it used in edges due to its slower spread compared with A. reptans.

== Uses ==
A. genevensis has uses within traditional Austrian medicine. It is taken internally as a tonic, for treatment of disorders related with the respiratory tract.

== See also ==
- List of extinct plants of the British Isles
