= Ajuga piskoi =

Scientific classification
- Kingdom: Plantae
- Clade: Tracheophytes
- Clade: Angiosperms
- Clade: Eudicots
- Clade: Asterids
- Order: Lamiales
- Family: Lamiaceae
- Genus: Ajuga
- Species: A. piskoi

Binomial name
- Ajuga piskoi Degen & Bald.

Species of flowering plant

Ajuga piskoi is a herbaceous flowering plant native to Greece, North Macedonia and Albania. It was first described in 1896.

== Description ==
This species is found in sunny locations within deciduous forest and shrubland, usually in grassy clearings or roadsides. It grows yellow/white flowers with purple veins in June/July. It is considered vulnerable due to deforestation.
