= Ajuga arabica =

Scientific classification
- Kingdom: Plantae
- Clade: Tracheophytes
- Clade: Angiosperms
- Clade: Eudicots
- Clade: Asterids
- Order: Lamiales
- Family: Lamiaceae
- Genus: Ajuga
- Species: A. arabica

Binomial name
- Ajuga arabica P.H. Davis.

Species of plant

Ajuga arabica is a herbaceous flowering plant native to central Saudi Arabia. It was first described in 1980.
