= Ajuga zakhoensis =

Scientific classification
- Kingdom: Plantae
- Clade: Tracheophytes
- Clade: Angiosperms
- Clade: Eudicots
- Clade: Asterids
- Order: Lamiales
- Family: Lamiaceae
- Genus: Ajuga
- Species: A. zakhoensis

Binomial name
- Ajuga zakhoensis Rech.f.

Species of plant

Ajuga zakhoensis is a herbaceous flowering plant native to northern Iraq. It was first described in 1982.
