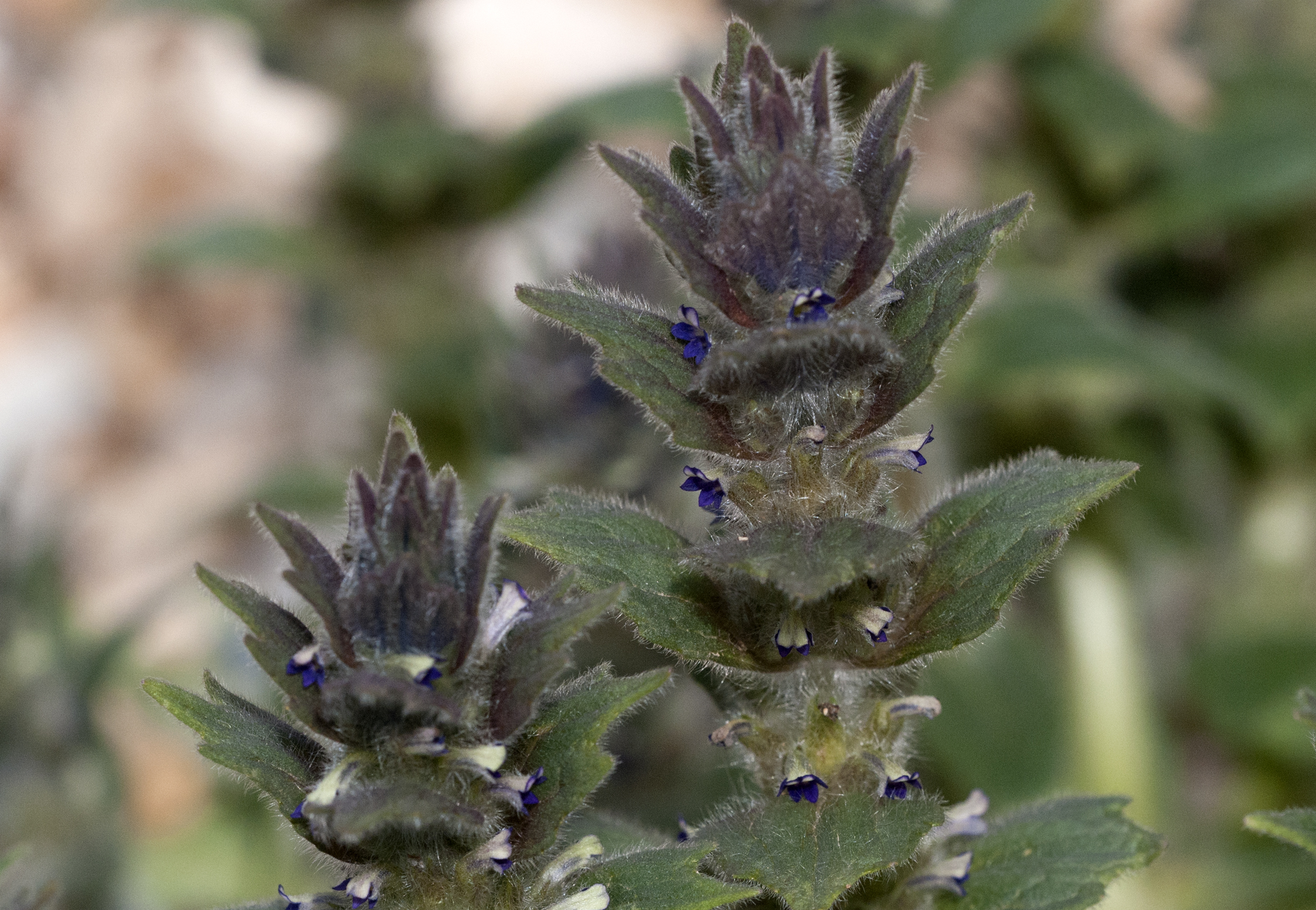

Scientific classification
- Kingdom: Plantae
- Clade: Tracheophytes
- Clade: Angiosperms
- Clade: Eudicots
- Clade: Asterids
- Order: Lamiales
- Family: Lamiaceae
- Genus: Ajuga
- Species: A. orientalis

Binomial name
- Ajuga orientalis L.

Synonyms
- Bugula obliqua Moench; Bugula orientalis Mill.; Bulga orientalis Kuntze

= Ajuga orientalis =

Species of flowering plant

Ajuga orientalis, also known as Oriental bugle and Eastern bugle, is a herbaceous flowering plant native to the Eastern Mediterranean. It is found in the sandy, dry brushwood and lightly forested regions of the coast. It is usually evergreen, although it may be briefly deciduous in cold winters.

== Description ==
This plant will grow to be 0.45 m (1 ft 6 in) wide and tall after 2–5 years of growing. The 6–30 cm (2.4–11.8 in) long flower stems are produced in spring and summer. They contain 4 to 12 flowers which are tube shaped,10–12 mm (0.39–0.47 in) long and cream/violet coloured. The calyx is 6–9 mm (0.24–0.35 in) long, with the top lip being cream coloured whilst the bottom being violet. The stamens are found inside. The grey-green leaves are oblong-elliptic, crenate-denate and usually 4–8 cm (1.6–3.1 in) long.

== Uses ==
This species, alongside most other Ajuga, claim to have medicinal effects, being used in traditional Turkish medicine.
