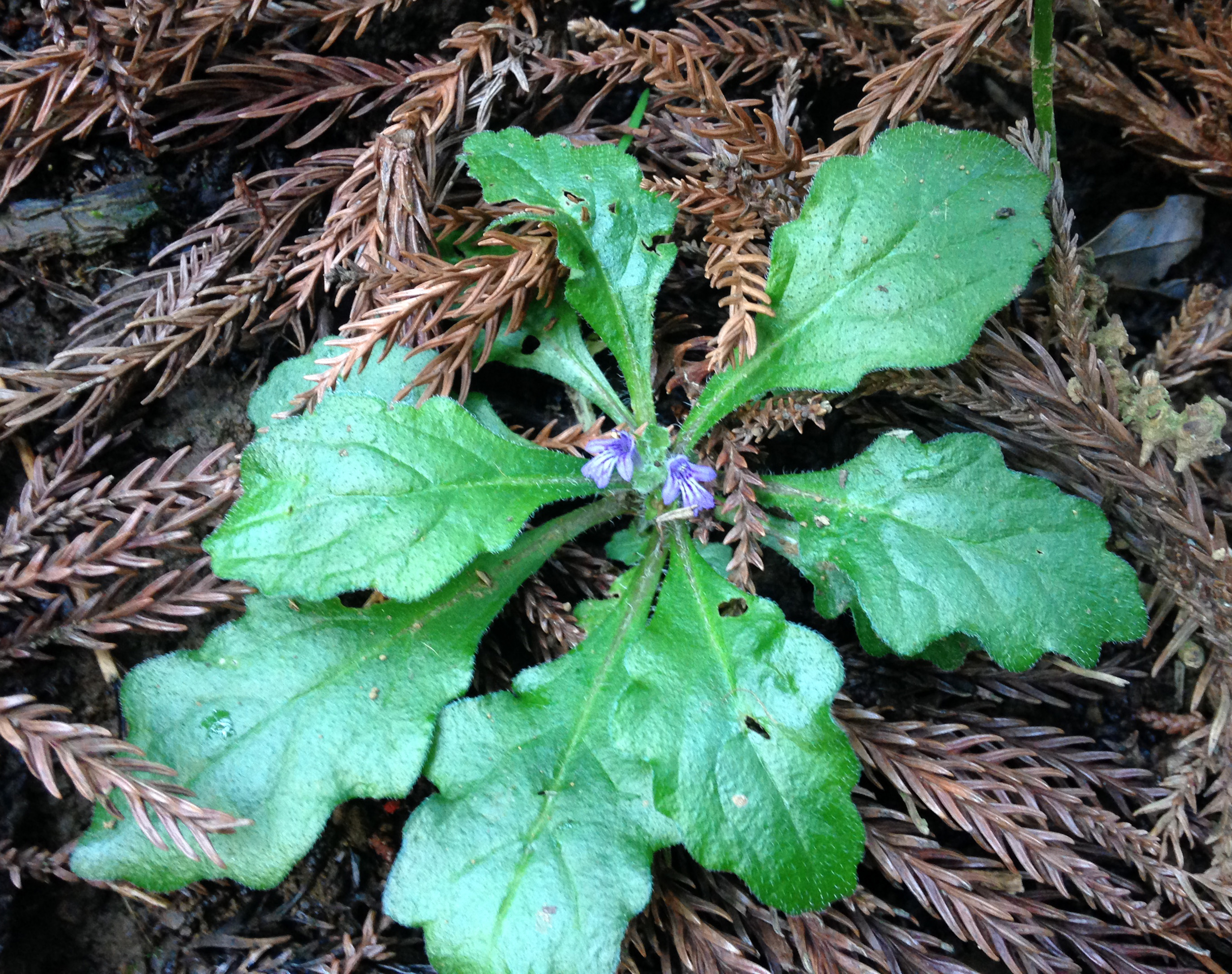

Scientific classification
- Kingdom: Plantae
- Clade: Embryophytes
- Clade: Tracheophytes
- Clade: Spermatophytes
- Clade: Angiosperms
- Clade: Eudicots
- Clade: Asterids
- Order: Lamiales
- Family: Lamiaceae
- Genus: Ajuga
- Species: A. decumbens

Binomial name
- Ajuga decumbens Thunb.

Synonyms
- Ajuga devestita H.Lév. & Vaniot.

= Ajuga decumbens =

Species of flowering plant

Ajuga decumbens is a herbaceous flowering plant native to China, Japan and Korea. It is commonly found in lightly forested sunny areas, such as meadows and roadsides between 400 and 2300 metres in altitude. This plant grows as a groundcover, and the leaf layer is usually no more than 100 millimetres (3.9 inches) tall. It flowers between April and June.

== Description ==
The purple to white erect flower stems can grow to 30 cm (12 in) tall, and are hermaphroditic. The corolla is straight, tubular and 8 mm (0.31 in) long. Petals are 5–8 mm (0.20–0.31 in) long. The leaves are purplish green and are 3–6 cm (1.2–2.4 in) wide to 1.5–2.5 cm (0.59–0.98 in) long. The entire plant is analgesic, decoagulant, depurative, febrifuge and haemostatic, and is used internally to relieve bladder ailments, whilst it is used externally to treat burns and cuts.
