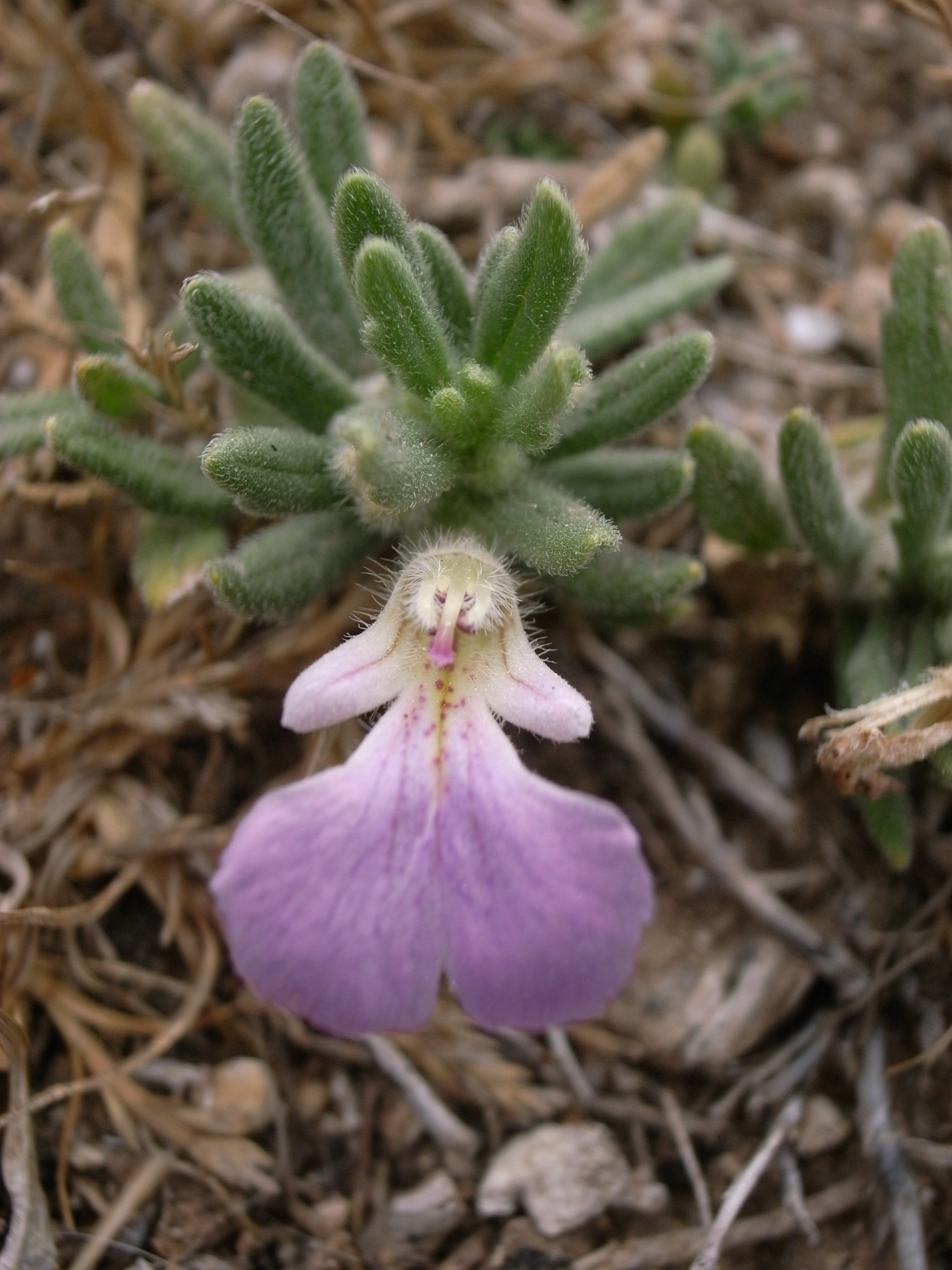

Scientific classification
- Kingdom: Plantae
- Clade: Tracheophytes
- Clade: Angiosperms
- Clade: Eudicots
- Clade: Asterids
- Order: Lamiales
- Family: Lamiaceae
- Genus: Ajuga
- Species: A. iva

Binomial name
- Ajuga iva (L.) Schreb.

Synonyms
- List: Bulga iva (L.) Kuntze; Chamaepitys iva (L.) Fourr.; Teucrium iva L.; Abiga cistifolia St.-Lag.; Ajuga moschata (Mill.) Schreb.; Ajuga pseudoiva Robill. & Castagne ex DC.; Bugula moschata (Mill.) Bubani; Chamaepitys pseudoiva (Robill. & Castagne ex DC.) Fourr.; Moscharia arabica Vitman; Moscharia asperidifolia Forssk.; Teucrium moschatum Mill.

= Ajuga iva =

Species of plant

Ajuga iva, the southern bugle, is a species of perennial herb in the family Lamiaceae. It have a self-supporting growth form and simple, broad leaves. Individuals can grow to 5 cm. Subspecies include Ajuga iva subsp. iva and Ajuga iva subsp. pseudoiva. The species is native to Europe, North Africa and parts of Western Asia including Turkey.
