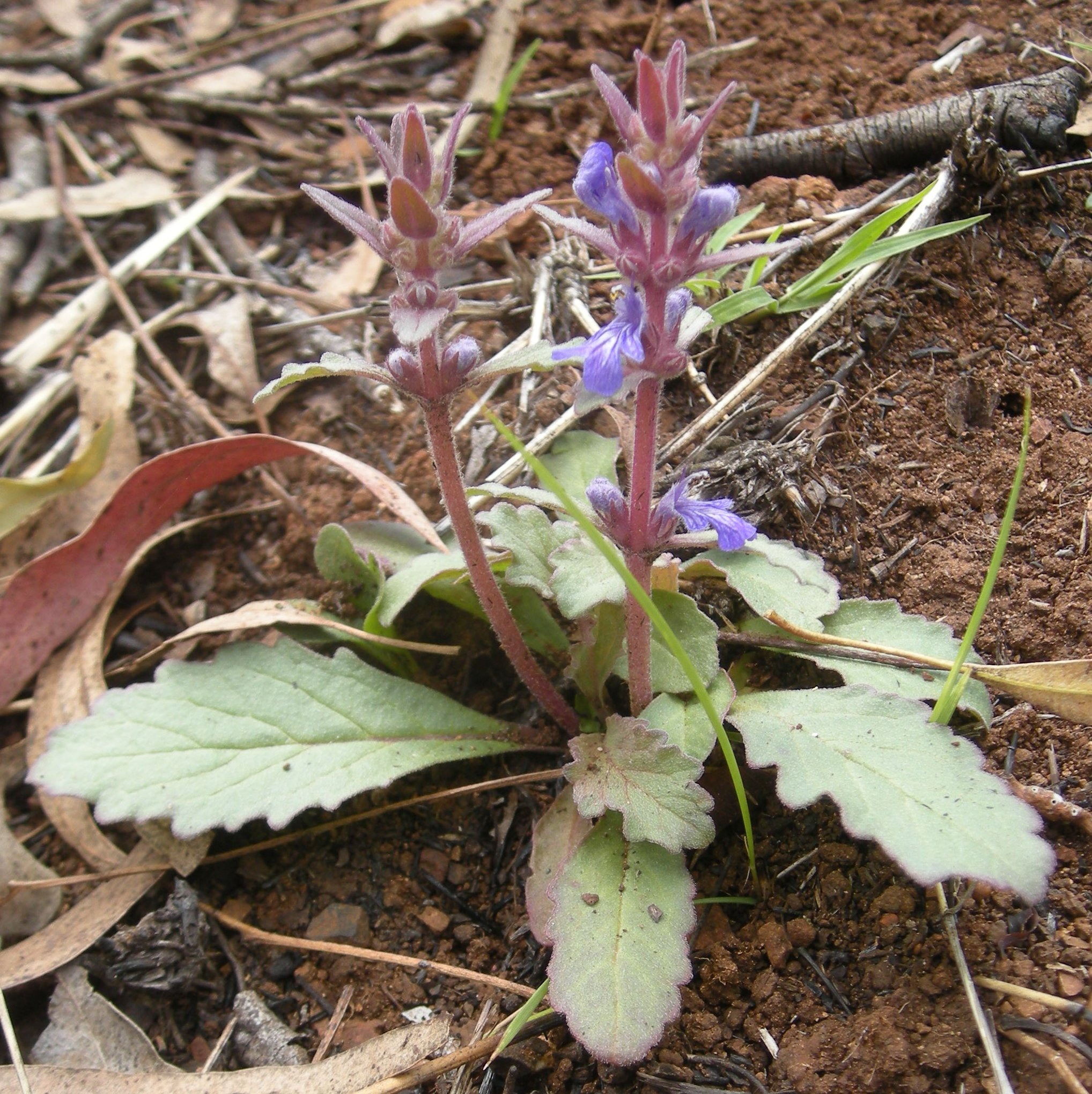

Scientific classification
- Kingdom: Plantae
- Clade: Tracheophytes
- Clade: Angiosperms
- Clade: Eudicots
- Clade: Asterids
- Order: Lamiales
- Family: Lamiaceae
- Genus: Ajuga
- Species: A. australis

Binomial name
- Ajuga australis R.Br.

= Ajuga australis =

Species of flowering plant

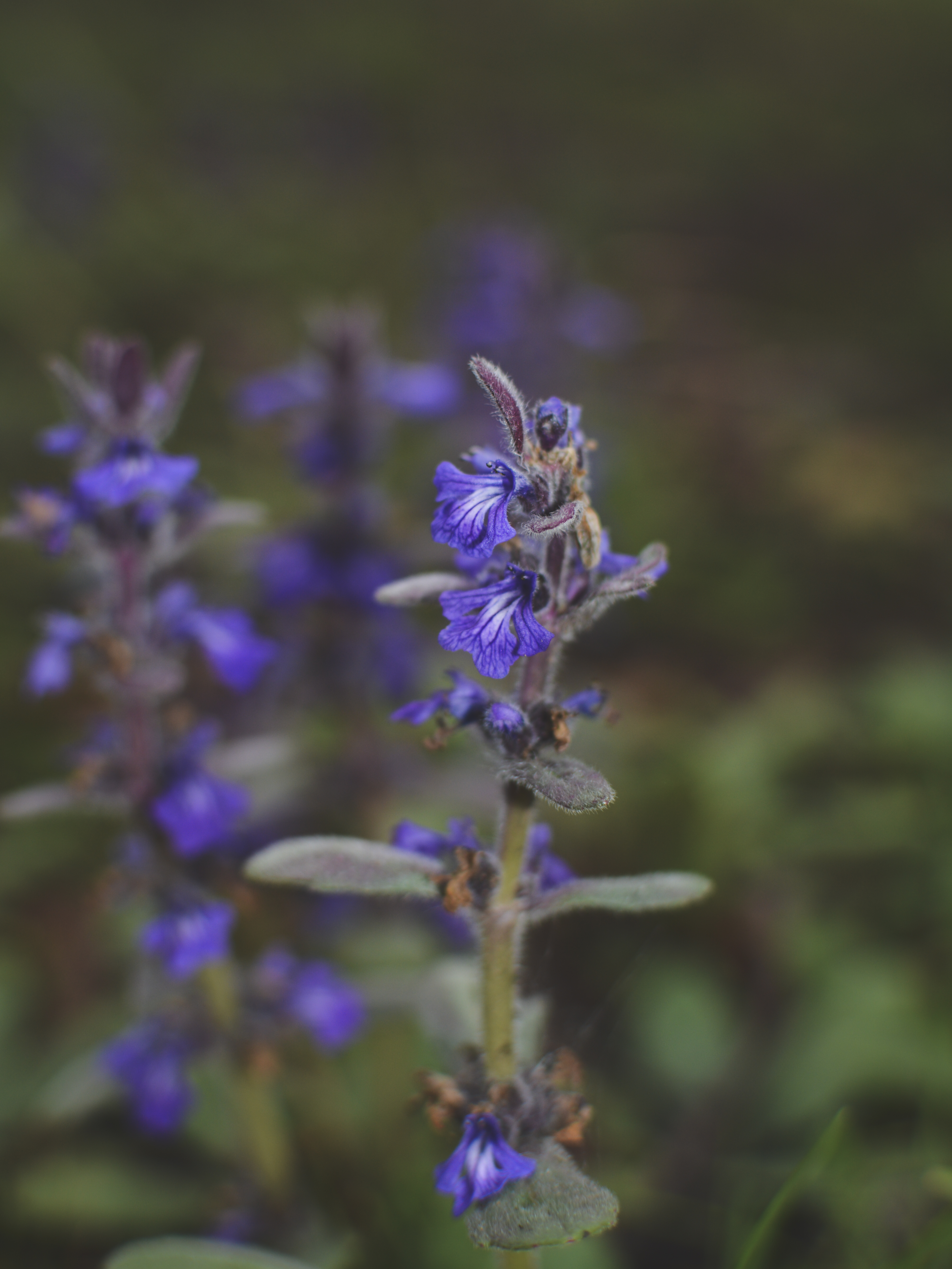
Ajuga australis flowers photographed in Adaminaby, NSW

Ajuga australis, commonly known as Austral bugle, is a herbaceous flowering plant native to Eastern Australia. First described by Robert Brown, it is occasionally seen in horticulture.

== Classification ==
Scottish botanist Robert Brown described the Austral bugle in his 1810 work Prodromus Florae Novae Hollandiae et Insulae Van Diemen.

== Description ==
It grows as a herbaceous shrub with a stem that bears flowers arising out of a loose rosette of leaves. Each leaf is obovate or elliptic and has a wedge-shaped base and is 3–12 cm long and 0.8–3.5 cm wide. The leaf is covered in fine hair, more prominent along the midrib. The purple flowers appear predominantly in spring but can appear at any time of year. The plants live for around two to three years. Ajuga australis grows on clay soils that are medium to high in nutrients, either on Wianamatta Shale, basalt, or alluvial quartzite.

In the Sydney region it is found in grassy woodlands growing under narrow-leaved ironbark (Eucalyptus crebra), forest red gum (E. tereticornis), grey box (E. moluccana), alongside kangaroo grass (Themeda triandra) or open forest under black sally (Eucalyptus stellulata) or snow gum (E. pauciflora). Ajuga australis can be readily grown in part-shaded or sunny spots in the garden on most soils. It is readily propagated by cuttings.

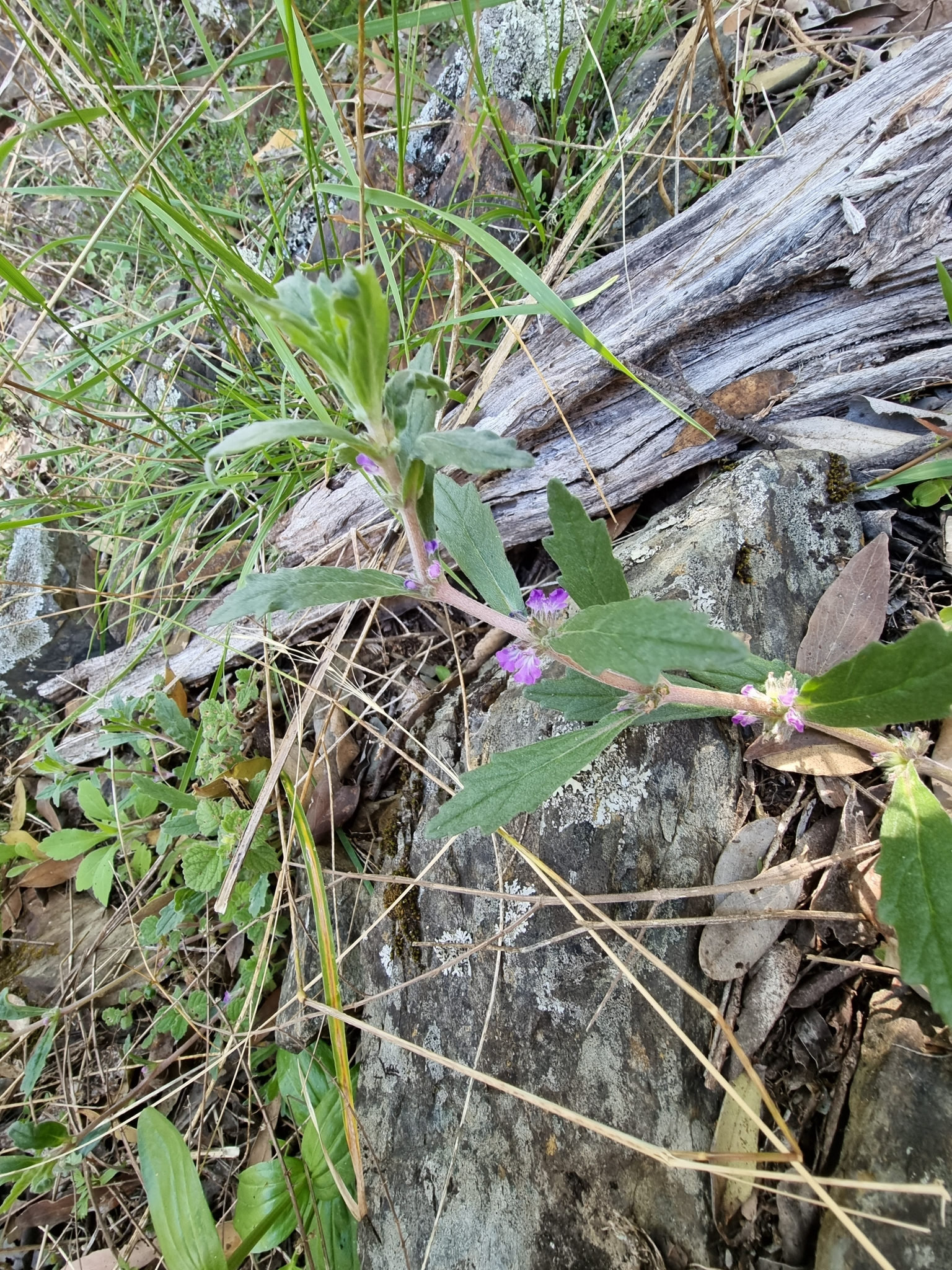
Ajuga australis growing in Armidale, NSW. Photo uploaded to iNaturalist by richarddimon

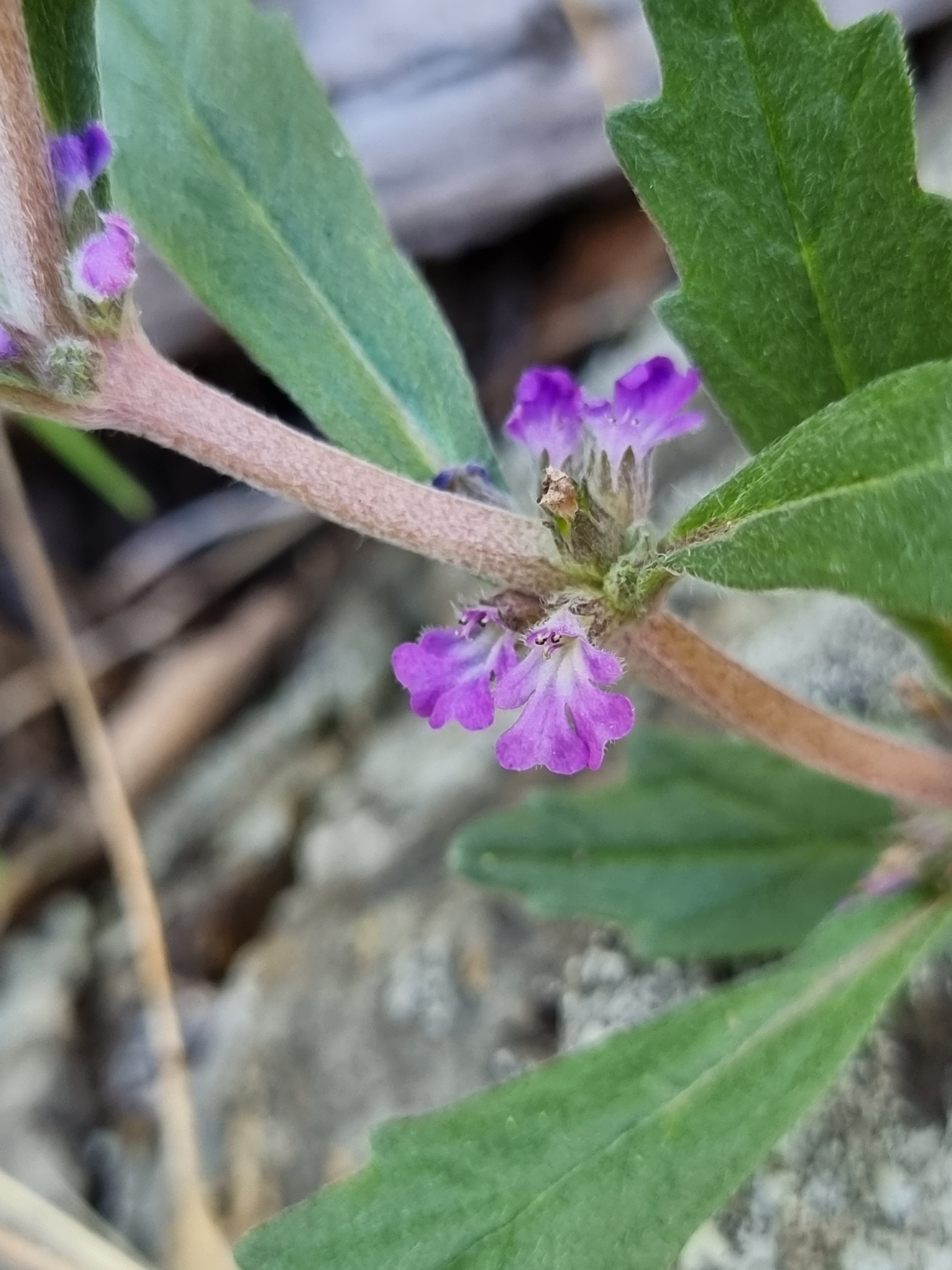
Ajuga australis in Armidale, NSW uploaded to iNaturalist by richarddimon
