= Apteropeda ovulum =

Scientific classification
- Kingdom: Animalia
- Phylum: Arthropoda
- Class: Insecta
- Order: Coleoptera
- Suborder: Polyphaga
- Infraorder: Cucujiformia
- Family: Chrysomelidae
- Genus: Apteropeda
- Species: A. ovulum

Binomial name
- Apteropeda ovulum (Illiger, 1807)

Species of beetle

Apteropeda ovulum is a species of flea beetle in the family Chrysomelidae that can be found in western Europe (France, Portugal and Spain) and North Africa (Algeria, Morocco, and Tunisia).
