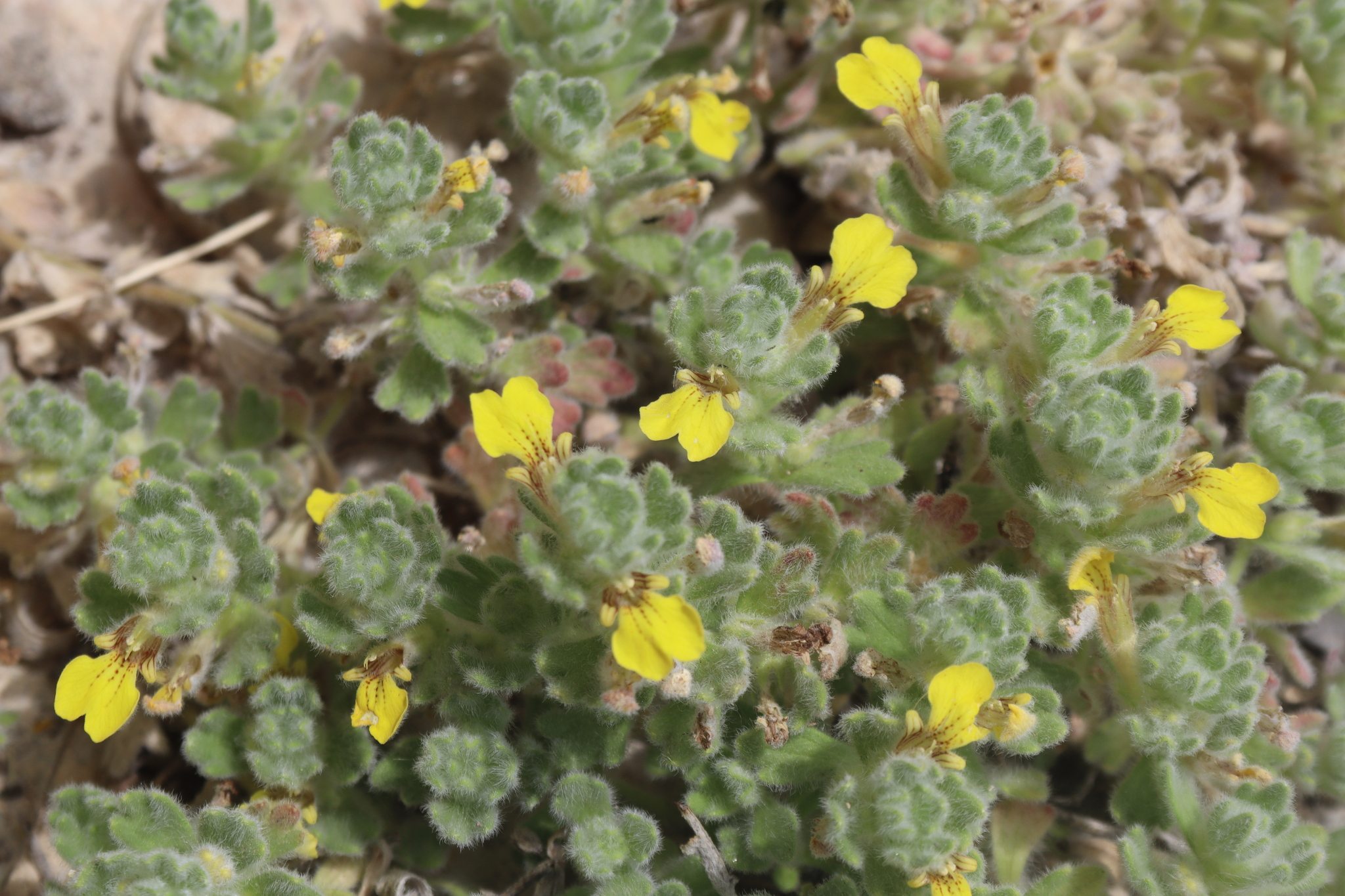

Scientific classification
- Kingdom: Plantae
- Clade: Tracheophytes
- Clade: Angiosperms
- Clade: Eudicots
- Clade: Asterids
- Order: Lamiales
- Family: Lamiaceae
- Genus: Ajuga
- Species: A. bombycina

Binomial name
- Ajuga bombycina Boiss.

Synonyms
- Ajuga argyrea Stapf; Chamaepitys bombycina (Boiss.) Holub

= Ajuga bombycina =

Species of plant in the mint family

Ajuga bombycina is a species of flowering plant in the family Lamiaceae, native to the east Aegean Islands and south-west and south Turkey.
