= Afroguatteria bequaertii =

Scientific classification
- Kingdom: Plantae
- Clade: Tracheophytes
- Clade: Angiosperms
- Clade: Magnoliids
- Order: Magnoliales
- Family: Annonaceae
- Genus: Afroguatteria
- Species: A. bequaertii

Binomial name
- Afroguatteria bequaertii (De Wild.) Boutique

Synonyms
- Uvaria bequaertii De Wild.

Species of flowering plant

Afroguatteria bequaertii is a species of plants in the custard apple family Annonaceae. It is endemic to the Democratic Republic of the Congo.
