= Afroguatteria discostigma =

Scientific classification
- Kingdom: Plantae
- Clade: Tracheophytes
- Clade: Angiosperms
- Clade: Magnoliids
- Order: Magnoliales
- Family: Annonaceae
- Genus: Afroguatteria
- Species: A. discostigma

Binomial name
- Afroguatteria discostigma (Diels) X.Guo & R.M.K.Saunders

Synonyms
- Cleistopholis discostigma Diels; Friesodielsia discostigma (Diels) Steenis; Oxymitra discostigma (Diels) Ghesq. ex Pellegr.; Richella discostigma (Diels) R.E.Fr.

Species of flowering plant

Afroguatteria discostigma is a species of plants in the family Annonaceae. It is endemic to Cameroon.
