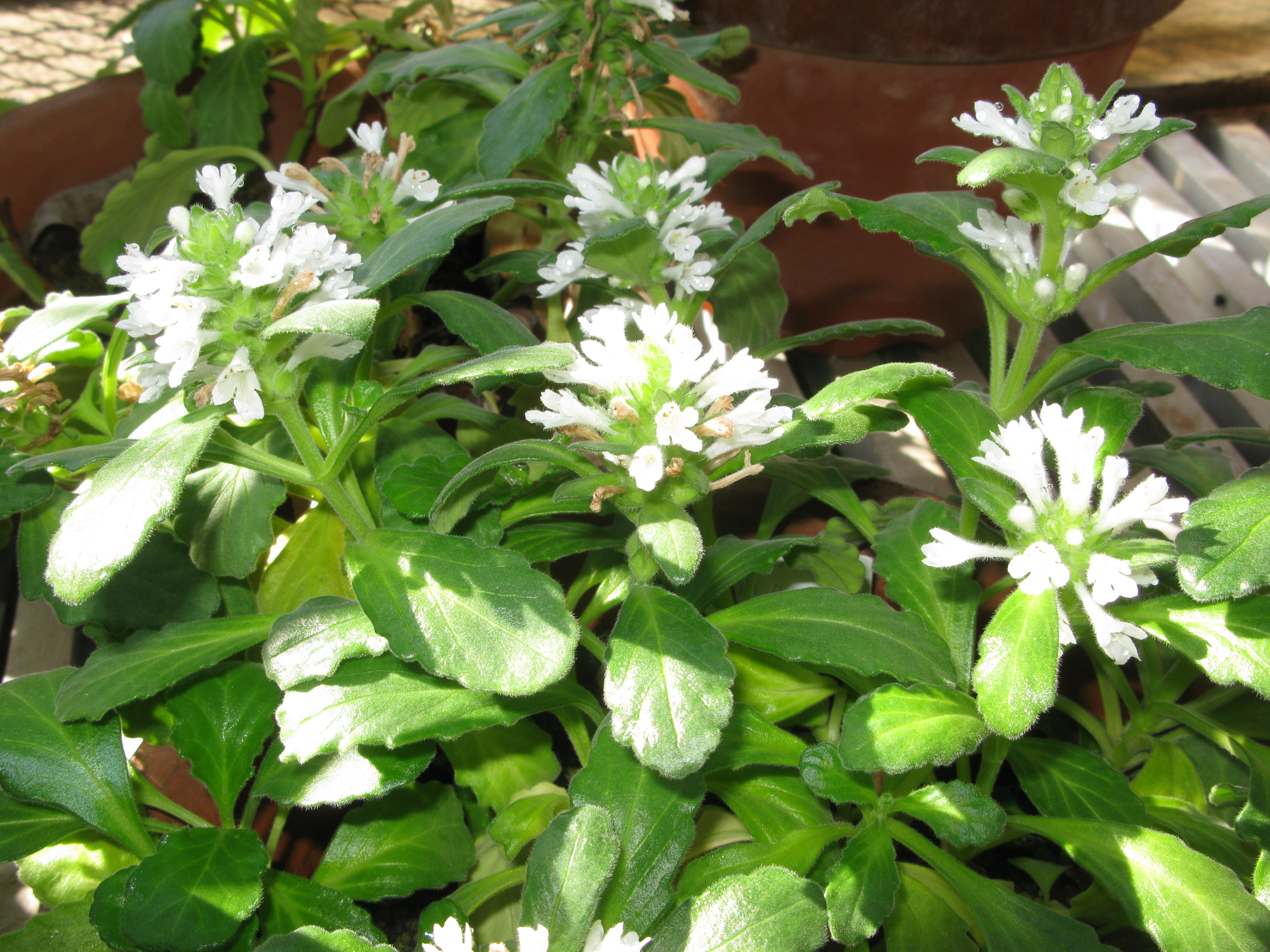

Scientific classification
- Kingdom: Plantae
- Clade: Tracheophytes
- Clade: Angiosperms
- Clade: Eudicots
- Clade: Asterids
- Order: Lamiales
- Family: Lamiaceae
- Genus: Ajuga
- Species: A. boninsimae

Binomial name
- Ajuga boninsimae Maxim.

= Ajuga boninsimae =

Species of plant

Ajuga boninsimae is a herbaceous flowering plant native to the Bonin Islands of Japan. It was first described in 1888.

== Description ==
Ajuga boninsimae reaches a height of 20 to 30 cm. It produces small white flowers between December and March. It appears about the edges and glades of mountainous forests. It has been described as rare.
