= Ajuga lupulina =

Scientific classification
- Kingdom: Plantae
- Clade: Tracheophytes
- Clade: Angiosperms
- Clade: Eudicots
- Clade: Asterids
- Order: Lamiales
- Family: Lamiaceae
- Genus: Ajuga
- Species: A. lupulina

Binomial name
- Ajuga lupulina Maxim.

Synonyms
- Ajuga lupulina f. breviflora Y.Z.Sun WSCP.; Ajuga lupulina f. humilis Y.Z.Sun WSCP.; Ajuga lupulina f. breviflora Y.Z.Sun WSCP.

Species of plant

Ajuga lupulina is a herbaceous flowering plant native to the Himalayan mountain ranges.

== Description ==
This species is found in sub-tropical zones at elevations from 1,300 to 4,500 metres. It grows in grasslands, alongside rivers and within rocky crevices.
