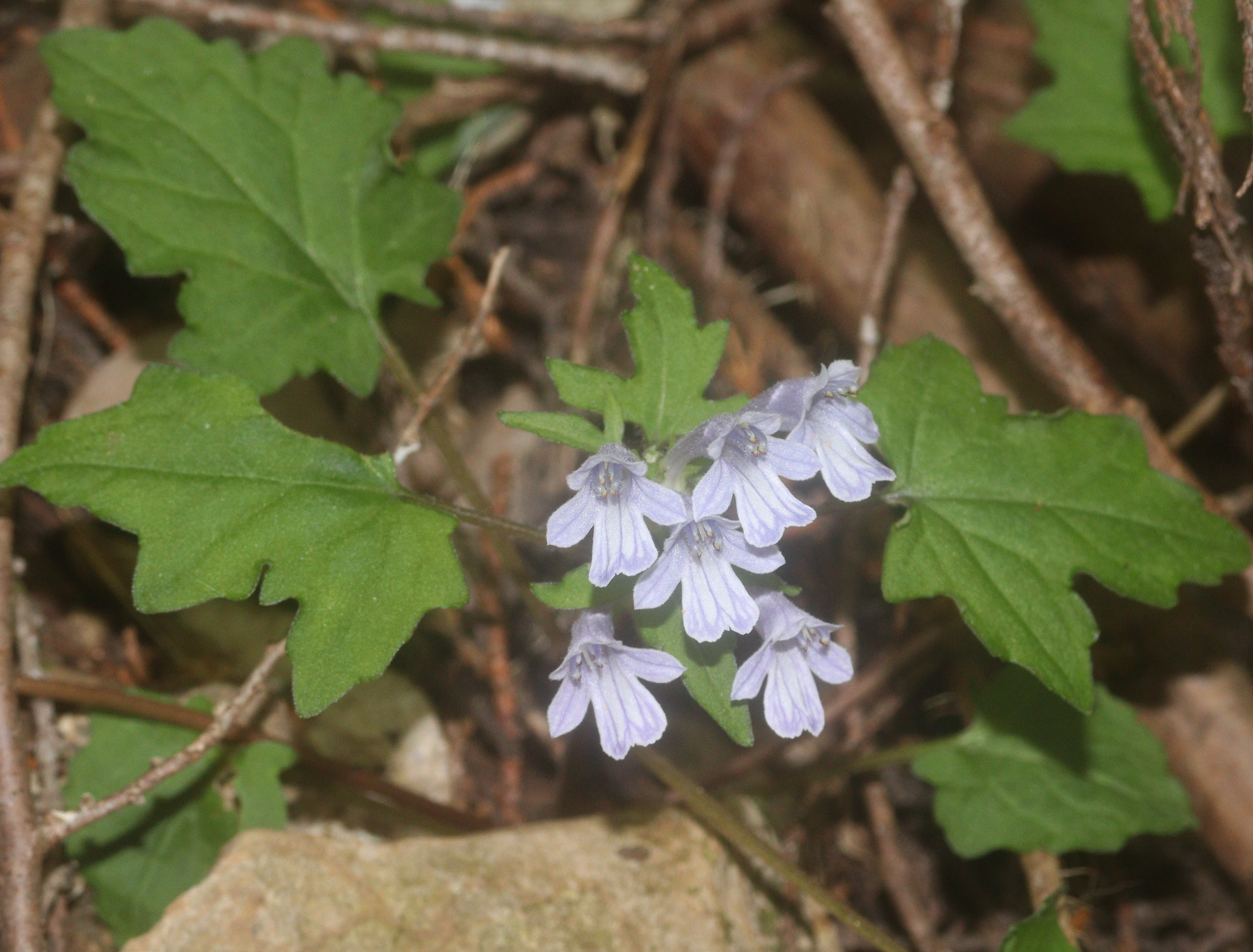

Scientific classification
- Kingdom: Plantae
- Clade: Embryophytes
- Clade: Tracheophytes
- Clade: Spermatophytes
- Clade: Angiosperms
- Clade: Eudicots
- Clade: Asterids
- Order: Lamiales
- Family: Lamiaceae
- Genus: Ajuga
- Species: A. japonica

Binomial name
- Ajuga japonica Miq.

Synonyms
- Ajuga grossidentata Lour.; Ajuga grossiserrata Willd.; Bulga japonica Wall.

= Ajuga japonica =

Species of flowering plant

Ajuga japonica is a herbaceous flowering plant native to Japan. The species grows as a groundcover on the forest floor, usually near streams. It is often found in large clusters, due to its spreading and seeding habit. It grows along the ground by stolons, and is usually 8–20 cm (3–8 in) high, including the flowers. It flowers between late April and late May.

== Description ==
The light purple flowers of A. japonica are tubular and lip-shaped, being 2–5 cm (0.79–1.97 in) long. These flowers grow from the tips of the flower stems. The pinnate, heart-shaped leaves have serrated margins and are 2–5 cm (0.79–1.97 in) long. They are situated opposite on the stem.

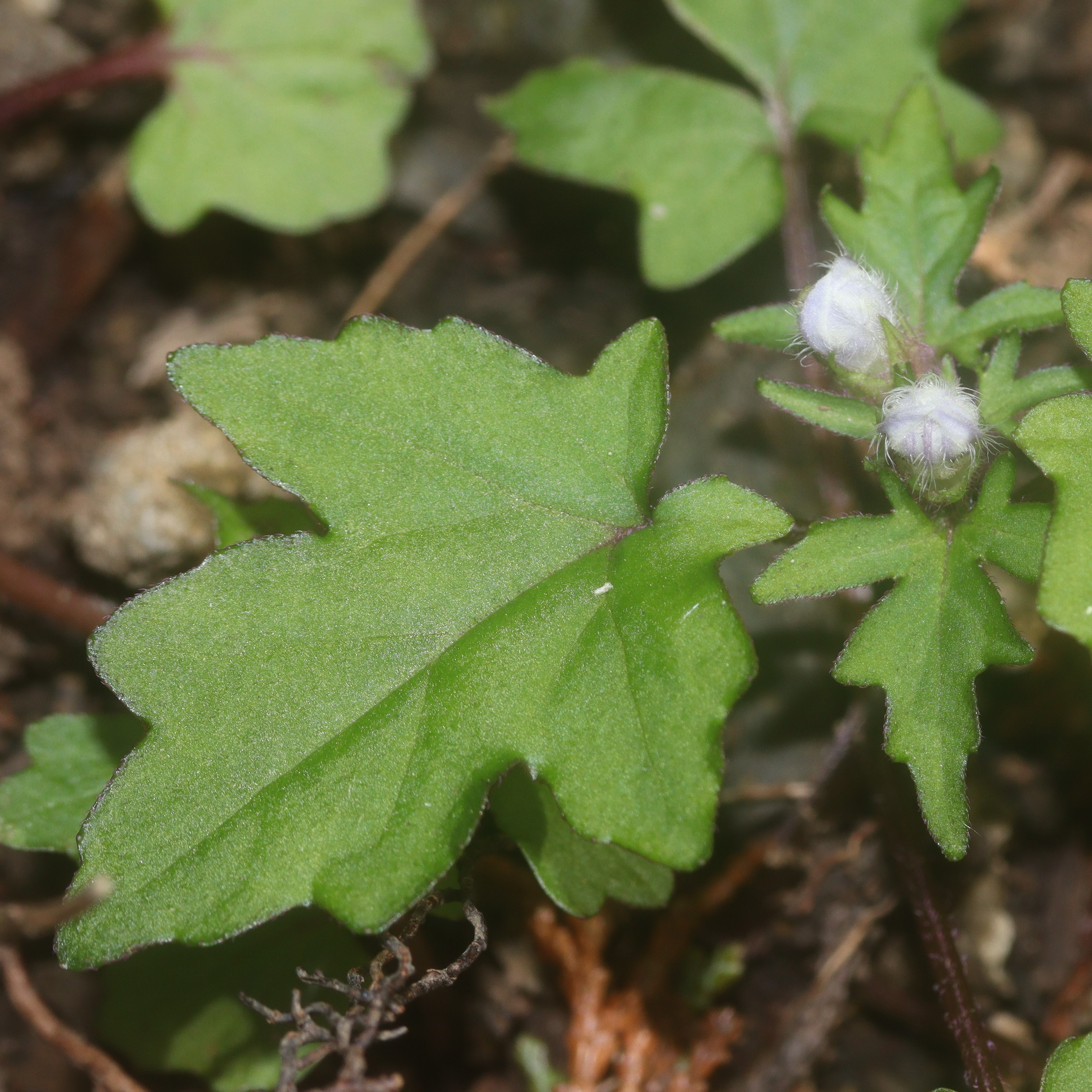
leaf

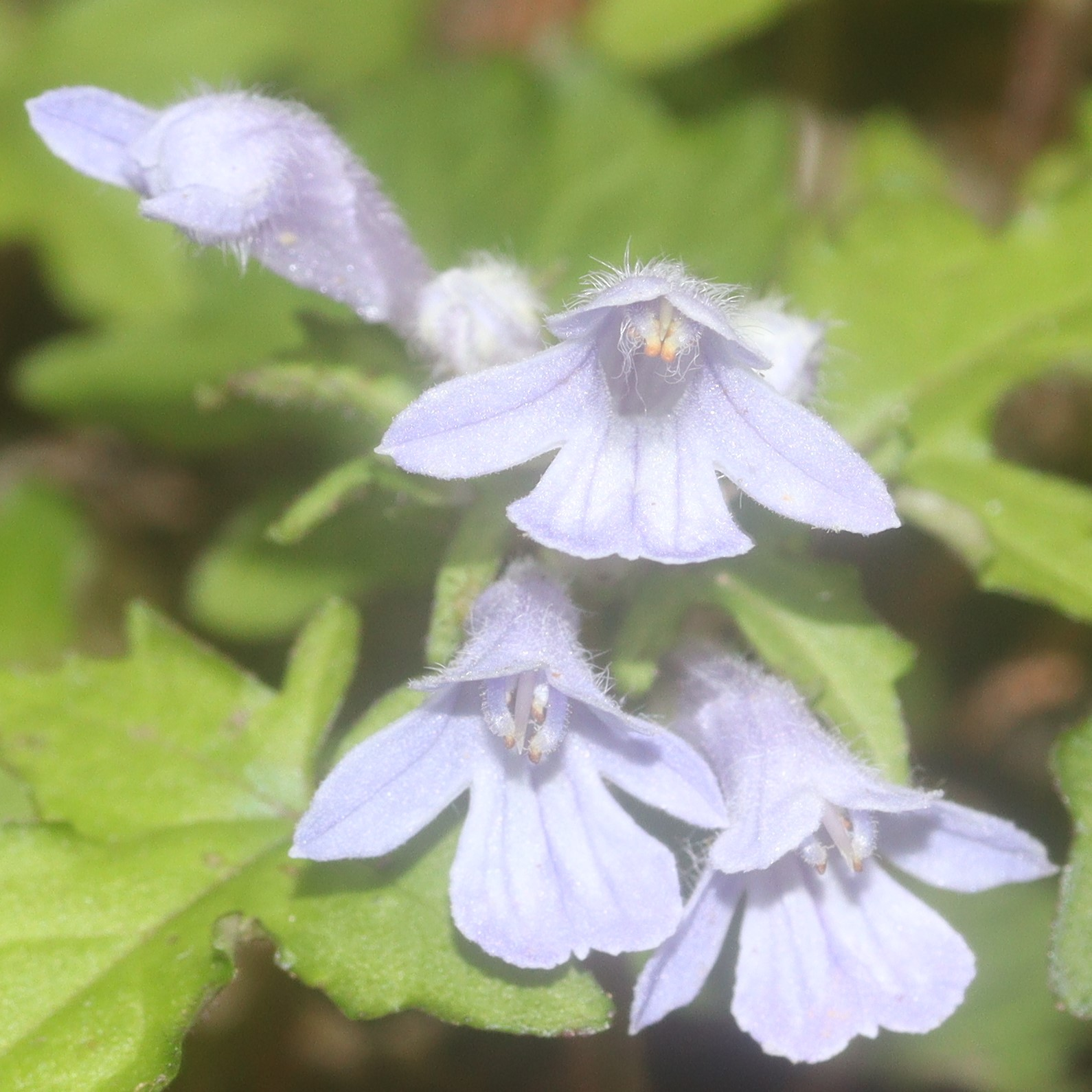
flower
