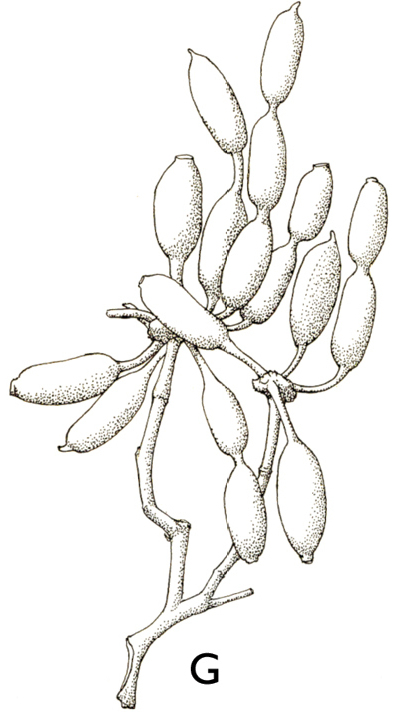
- Infructescence of Afroguatteria discostigma

Scientific classification
- Kingdom: Plantae
- Clade: Tracheophytes
- Clade: Angiosperms
- Clade: Magnoliids
- Order: Magnoliales
- Family: Annonaceae
- Subfamily: Annonoideae
- Tribe: Uvarieae
- Genus: Afroguatteria; Boutique

Type species
- Afroguatteria bequaertii Boutique

= Afroguatteria =

Genus of flowering plants

Afroguatteria is a small genus of vines in the family Annonaceae, native to Cabinda, Cameroon and Zaire in west Africa.

== Species ==
As of January 2025, Plants of the World Online accepts the following 3 species:

- Afroguatteria bequaertii (De Wild.) Boutique
- Afroguatteria discostigma (Diels) X.Guo & R.M.K.Saunders
- Afroguatteria globosa C.N.Paiva

== Taxonomy ==
The genus was first described and published in Bulletin du Jardin botanique de l'État à Bruxelles in 1951.

The genus name of Afroguatteria is in honour of Giambattista Guatteri (1739–1793), an Italian professor of botany in Parma, and the continent, where the plants were found, 'Afro' - africa.

The genus is recognized by the United States Department of Agriculture and the Agricultural Research Service, but they do not list any known species.
