= Amastra globosa =

Scientific classification
- Kingdom: Animalia
- Phylum: Mollusca
- Class: Gastropoda
- Order: Stylommatophora
- Family: Amastridae
- Genus: Amastra
- Species: †A. globosa

Binomial name
- †Amastra globosa C. M. Cooke, 1933

Synonyms
- † Amastra (Cyclamastra) globosa C. M. Cooke, 1933 alternative representation

Species of gastropod

Amastra globosa is an extinct species of air-breathing land snail, a terrestrial pulmonate gastropod mollusc in the family Amastridae.

== Distribution ==
This species was endemic to Hawai, occurring on Oahu Island.
