= Afroguatteria globosa =

Scientific classification
- Kingdom: Plantae
- Clade: Tracheophytes
- Clade: Angiosperms
- Clade: Magnoliids
- Order: Magnoliales
- Family: Annonaceae
- Genus: Afroguatteria
- Species: A. globosa

Binomial name
- Afroguatteria globosa Paiva

Species of flowering plant

Afroguatteria globosa is a species of plants in the family Annonaceae. It is endemic to Cabinda.
