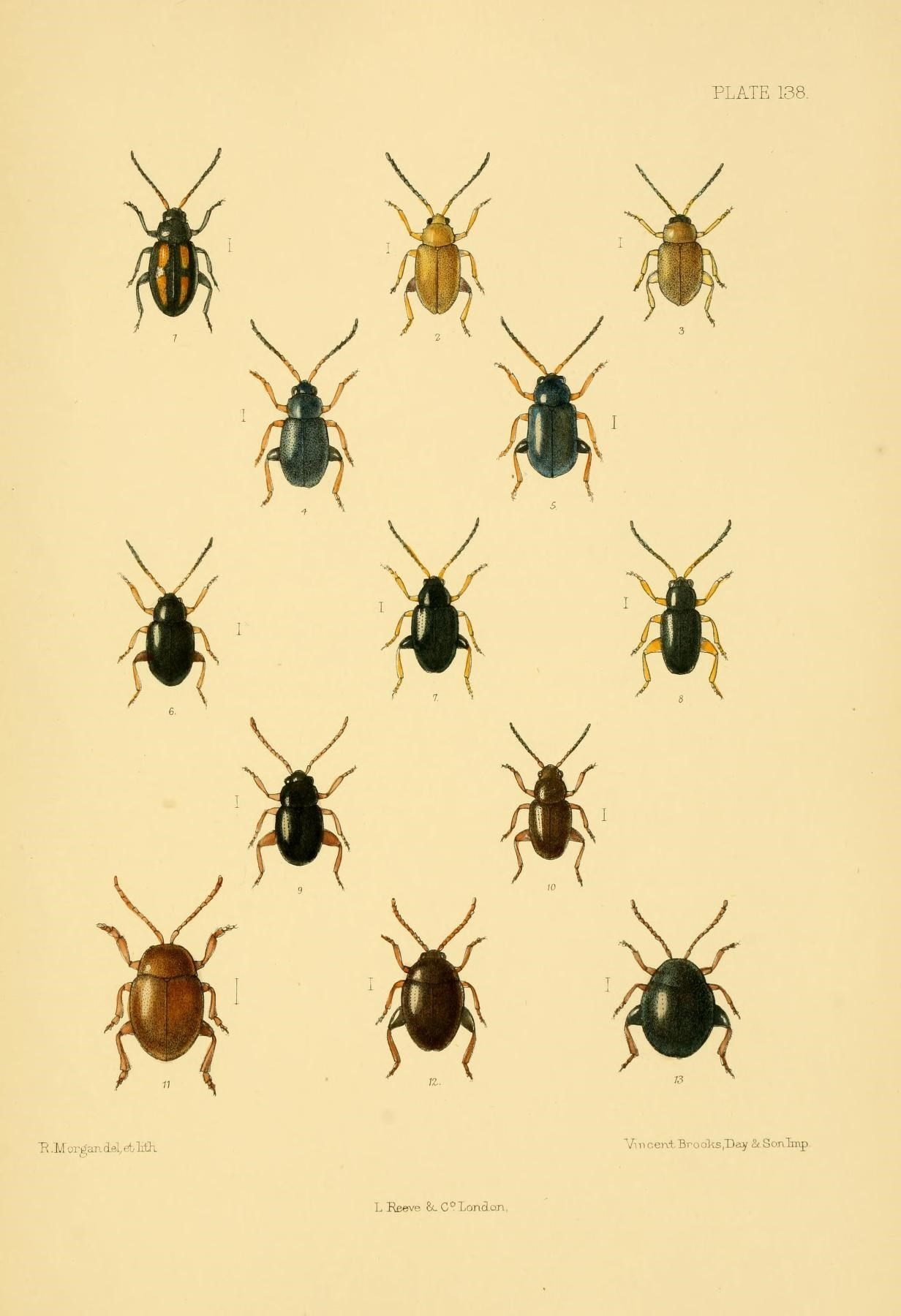
- Apteropeda globosa no 13

Scientific classification
- Kingdom: Animalia
- Phylum: Arthropoda
- Clade: Pancrustacea
- Class: Insecta
- Order: Coleoptera
- Suborder: Polyphaga
- Infraorder: Cucujiformia
- Family: Chrysomelidae
- Genus: Apteropeda
- Species: A. globosa

Binomial name
- Apteropeda globosa (Illiger, 1794)

Synonyms
- Altica globosa Illiger, 1794; Haltica conglomerata Illiger, 1807; Haltica globus Duftschmid, 1825; Apteropeda nigroaenea Weidenbach, 1859; Apteropeda majuscula Foudras, 1860

= Apteropeda globosa =

Species of beetle

Apteropeda globosa is a species of flea beetle in the family Chrysomelidae. It can be found in Benelux, Ireland, Portugal, Romania, Slovakia, Slovenia, Austria, British Isles, Czech Republic, Denmark, France, Germany, northern Italy, southwestern Poland, Spain, and Western Ukraine. It is green coloured,

== Habitat ==
The species feeds on various Lamiaceae and Veronica species.
