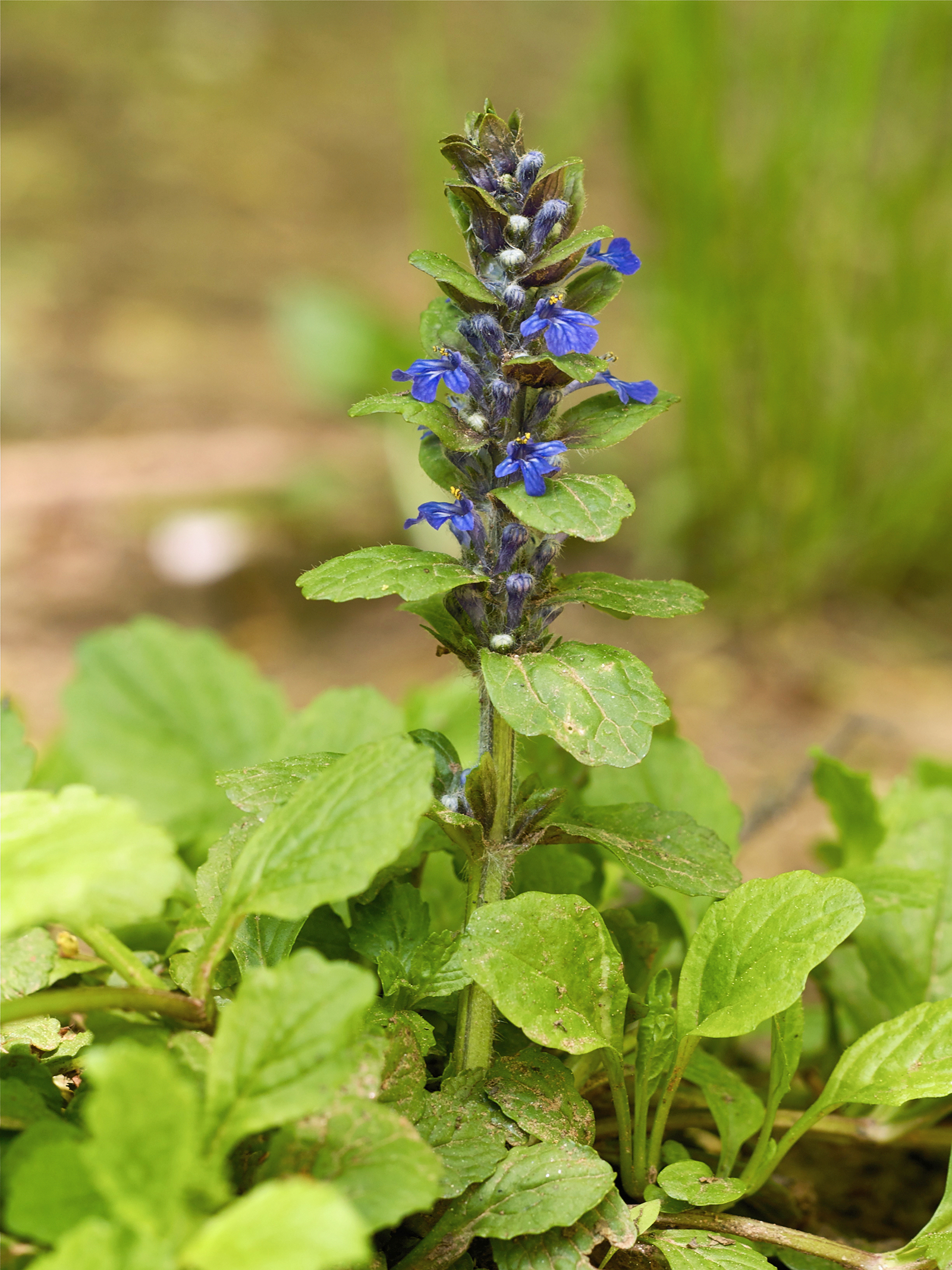
- Common bugle (Ajuga reptans)

Scientific classification
- Kingdom: Plantae
- Clade: Tracheophytes
- Clade: Angiosperms
- Clade: Eudicots
- Clade: Asterids
- Order: Lamiales
- Family: Lamiaceae
- Tribe: Ajugeae
- Genus: Ajuga; L.(1753)

Type species
- Ajuga reptans L.

Synonyms
- Abiga Saint-Lager; Bugula P. Miller; Chamaepitys Hill; Moscharia Forssk. 1775 rejected name, not Ruiz & Pav. 1794 conserved name; Phleboanthe Tausch; Rosenbachia Regel; Bulga Kuntze

= Ajuga =

Genus of flowering plants

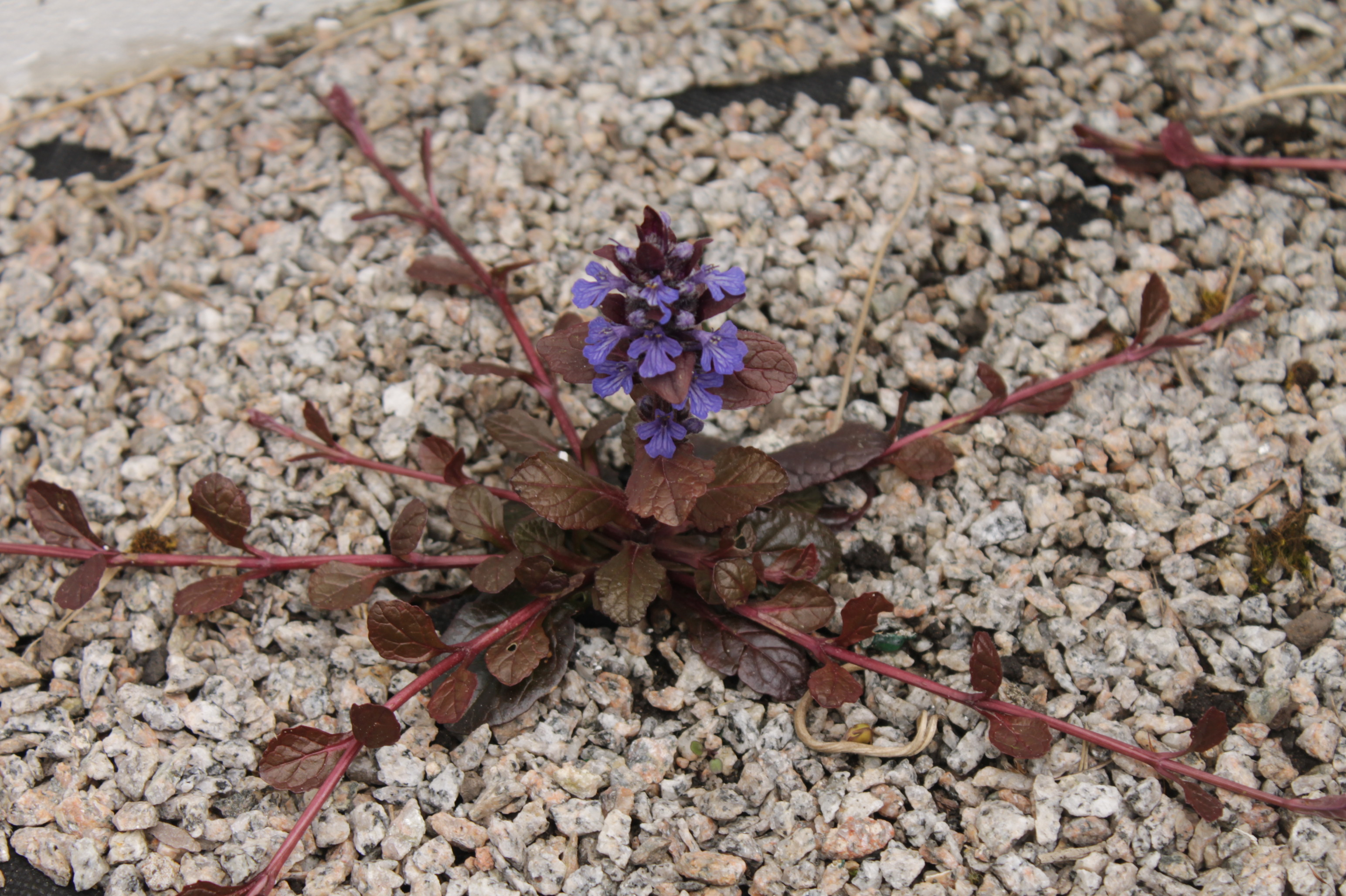
Ajuga on fine gravel

Ajuga /əˈdʒuːɡə/, also known as bugleweed, ground pine, carpet bugle, or just bugle, is a genus of flowering plants in the Ajugeae tribe of the mint family Lamiaceae. Over 60 species of annual or perennial, mostly herbaceous plants are known. They are native to Europe, Asia, Africa, and Australia.

They grow to 5–50 cm (2.0–19.7 in) tall, with opposite leaves.

== Species ==
Species accepted within Ajuga include:

- Ajuga arabica P.H.Davis – Saudi Arabia
- Ajuga australis R.Br. - Australia
- Ajuga bombycina Boiss. – Aegean Islands, Turkey
- Ajuga boninsimae Maxim. – Ogasawara-shoto (Bonin Islands of Japan)
- Ajuga brachystemon Maxim. – Uttarakhand, Nepal, northern India
- Ajuga campylantha Diels – Yunnan
- Ajuga campylanthoides C.Y.Wu & C.Chen – Tibet, central China
- Ajuga chamaecistus Ging. ex Benth. – Iran, Afghanistan
- Ajuga chamaepitys (L.) Schreb. – central and southern Europe, central and southwestern Asia
- Ajuga chasmophila P.H.Davis – Syria
- Ajuga ciliata Bunge – China, Korea, Japan
- Ajuga davisiana Kit Tan & Yildiz – Turkey
- Ajuga decaryana Danguy ex R.A.Clement – Madagascar
- Ajuga decumbens Thunb. – decumbent bugle – China, Korea, Japan, Taiwan, Ryukyu Islands
- Ajuga dictyocarpa Hayata – - China, Vietnam, Taiwan, Ryukyu Islands
- Ajuga fauriei H.Lév. & Vaniot – Korea
- Ajuga flaccida Baker – Madagascar
- Ajuga forrestii Diels – China, Tibet, Nepal
- Ajuga genevensis L. – central and southern Europe, Caucasus; naturalized in North America
- Ajuga grandiflora Stapf – South Australia
- Ajuga incisia Maxim – Honshu Island in Japan
- Ajuga integrifolia Buch.-Ham. – central and eastern Africa, southern Asia (Saudi Arabia, Iran, India, China, Indonesia, etc.), New Guinea
- Ajuga iva (L.) Schreb. – Mediterranean region from Canary Islands and Madeira to Turkey and Palestine
- Ajuga japonica Miq. – Japan
- Ajuga laxmannii (Murray) Benth. – southeastern Europe from Czech Republic to Greece; Turkey, Caucasus
- Ajuga leucantha Lukhoba – Uganda, DRoC, Ethiopia
- Ajuga linearifolia Pamp. – China
- Ajuga lobata D.Don – China, Nepal, Bhutan, Assam, Myanmar
- Ajuga lupulina Maxim. - China, Nepal, Bhutan, Assam
- Ajuga macrosperma Wall. ex Benth. – China, Nepal, Bhutan, Assam, northern and eastern India, northern Indochina
- Ajuga makinoi Nakai – Honshu Island in Japan
- Ajuga mollis Gladkova – Crimea
- Ajuga multiflora Bunge – Korean pyramid bugle – China, Korea, Chita region of Siberia, Amur, Primorye
- Ajuga nipponensis Makino – China, Korea, Japan, Vietnam, Taiwan
- Ajuga novoguineensis A.J.Paton & R.J.Johns – New Guinea
- Ajuga nubigena Diels – Tibet, Sichuan, Yunnan
- Ajuga oblongata M.Bieb. – Iraq, Caucasus
- Ajuga oocephala Baker – Madagascar
- Ajuga ophrydris Burch. ex Benth. – South Africa, Eswatini, Lesotho
- Ajuga orientalis L. – eastern Mediterranean
- Ajuga ovalifolia Bureau & Franch. – China
- Ajuga palaestina - Palestine (Region), Turkey
- Ajuga pantantha Hand.-Mazz. – Yunnan
- Ajuga parviflora Benth. – Afghanistan, Pakistan, northern India, Nepal
- Ajuga piskoi Degen & Bald. – Albania, Yugoslavia
- Ajuga postii Briq. – Turkey
- Ajuga pygmaea A.Gray – China, Japan, Taiwan, Ryukyu Islands
- Ajuga pyramidalis L. – central + southern Europe
- Ajuga relicta P.H.Davis – Turkey
- Ajuga reptans L. – Europe, Algeria, Tunisia, Iran, Turkey, Caucasus; naturalized in New Zealand, North America, and Venezuela
- Ajuga robusta Baker – Madagascar
- Ajuga salicifolia (L.) Schreb. – Balkans, Crimea, southern Russia, Turkey
- Ajuga saxicola Assadi & Jamzad – Iran
- Ajuga sciaphila W.W.Sm..- southwestern China
- Ajuga shikotanensis Miyabe & Tatew – Japan, Kuril Islands
- Ajuga sinuata R.Br. – New South Wales
- Ajuga spectabilis Nakai – Korean bugle – Korea
- Ajuga taiwanensis Nakai ex Murata – Taiwan, Ryukyu Islands, Philippines
- Ajuga tenorii C.Presl in J.S.Presl & C.B.Presl – Italy
- Ajuga turkestanica (Regel) Briq. – Tajikistan, Uzbekistan
- Ajuga vesiculifera Herder – Kyrgyzstan
- Ajuga vestita Boiss. – Turkey, Iran
- Ajuga xylorrhiza Kit Tan – Turkey
- Ajuga yesoensis Maxim. ex Franch. & Sav. – Japan
- Ajuga zakhoensis Rech.f. – Iraq

== Gallery ==
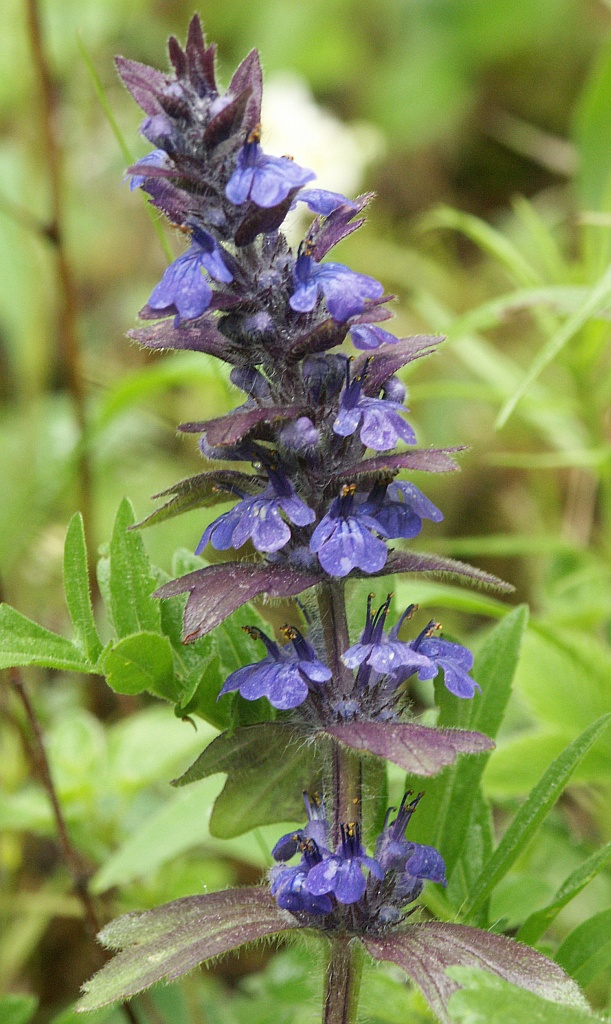
Blue bugle (Ajuga genevensis)

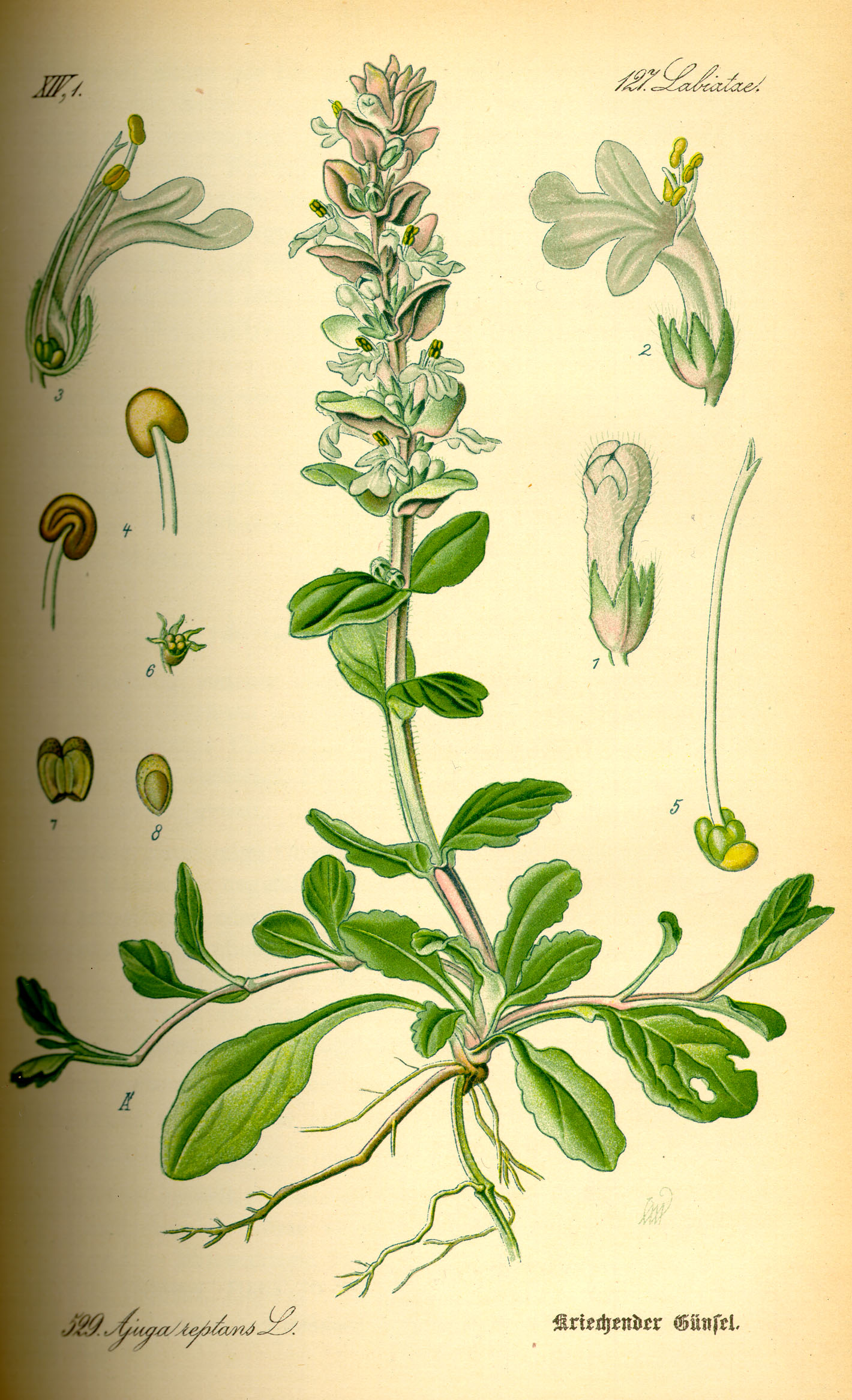
Common bugle from Thomé, Flora von Deutschland, Österreich und der Schweiz, 1885

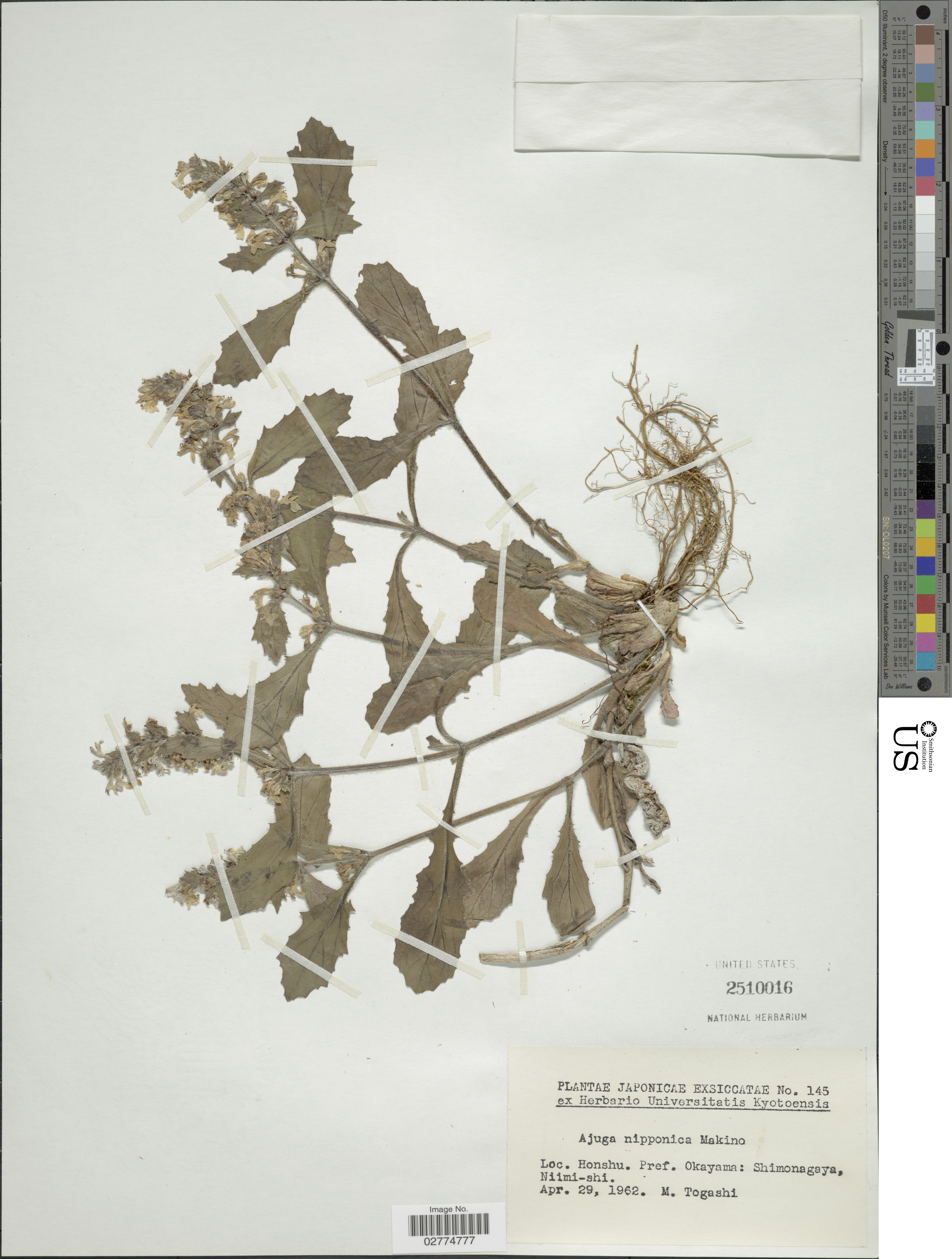
Color specimen of Ajuga nipponica 'Makino', 1962

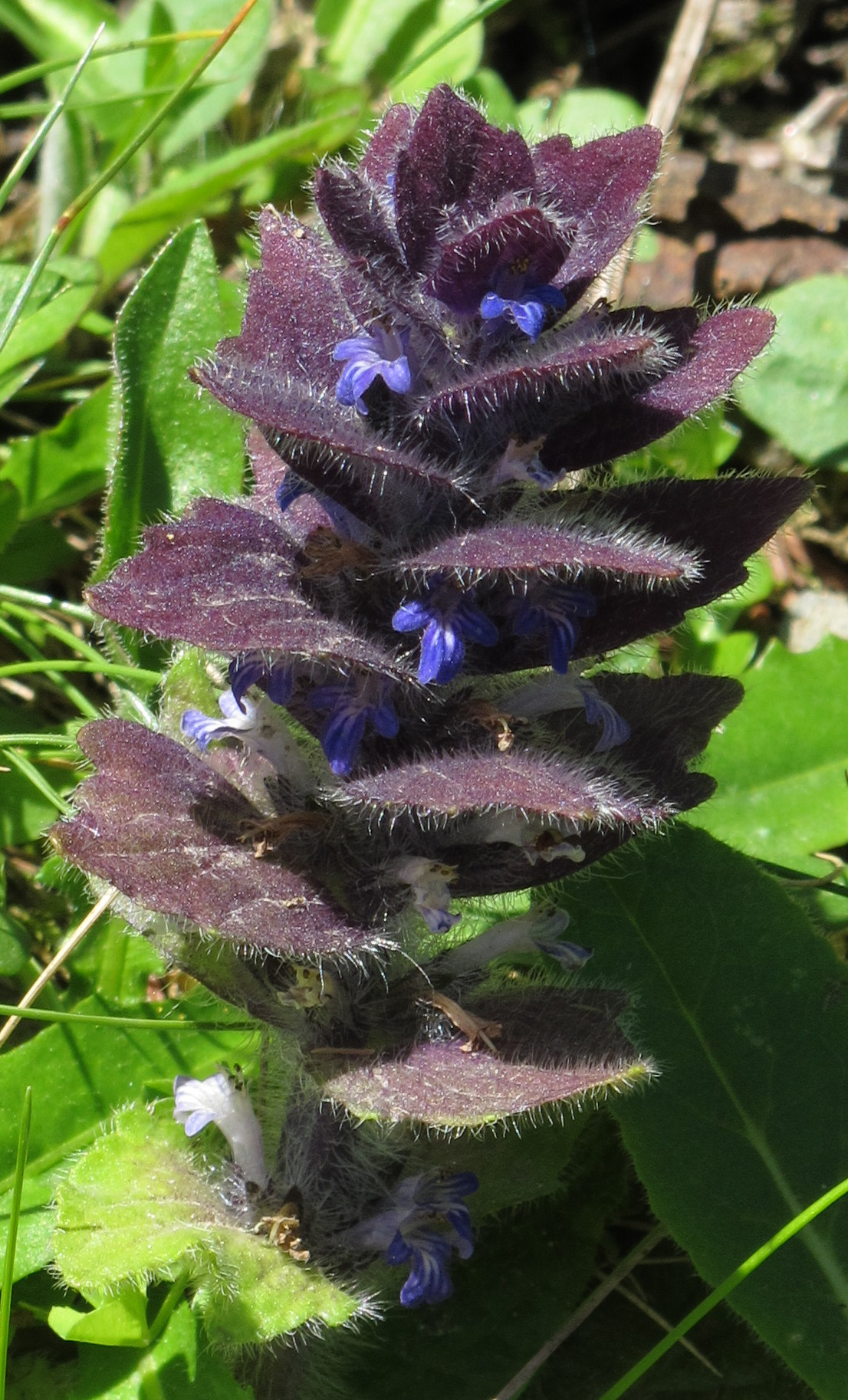
Pyramid bugle (Ajuga pyramidalis)
