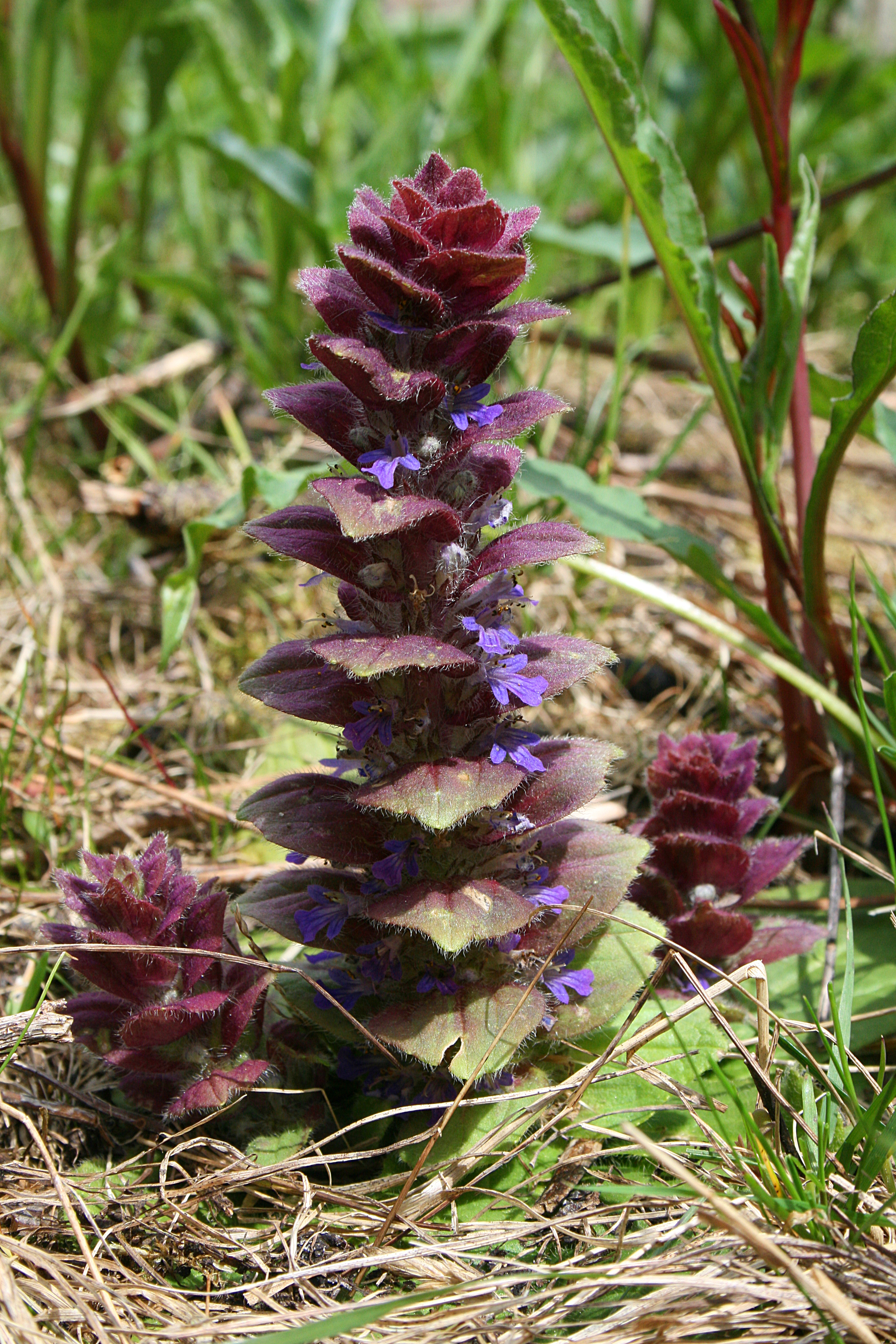

Scientific classification
- Kingdom: Plantae
- Clade: Tracheophytes
- Clade: Angiosperms
- Clade: Eudicots
- Clade: Asterids
- Order: Lamiales
- Family: Lamiaceae
- Genus: Ajuga
- Species: A. pyramidalis

Binomial name
- Ajuga pyramidalis L.

= Ajuga pyramidalis =

Species of flowering plant

Ajuga pyramidalis, commonly known as pyramidal bugle, is a flowering plant of the genus Ajuga in the family Lamiaceae. It is a native plant in Europe.

== Description ==
Pyramidal bugle is a perennial, herbaceous plant growing from about 5 to 20 cm (2 to 8 in) tall. At the base there is a rosette of stalked leaves which are significantly larger than the stem leaves. The stiff upright hairy stem is square and bears simple leaves growing in opposite pairs. They are ovate, hairy above and below and have a slightly wavy edge. The inflorescence has leaf-like bracts subtending the individual flowers. The bracts gradually get smaller towards the tip of the inflorescence, are always longer than the flowers and the upper ones are often tinged purple. The inflorescence forms a pyramid-shaped terminal spike and is formed of axillary whorls. The calyx of each flower is five-lobed, the bluish-violet corolla has a long tube and is fused, with two lips. The upper lip is very short and the lower lip is three-lobed. There are four stamens, two long and two short. The gynoecium is formed of two fused carpels and the fruit is a four-chambered schizocarp. The hermaphrodite flowers are zygomorphic. The flowers produce nectar to attract pollinators which are bumblebees and butterflies.

The flowering time extends from June to August. The chromosome number is 2n = 32.

== Ecology ==
The bracts in the inflorescence shelter the flowers from rain, and their violet colour enhances the signal effect for pollinators. The calyx are haired, protecting the flower from crawling insects. Additionally, the nectar is secured by a stiff, upturned hair ring. The fruits contain fleshy, oily elaiosomes.

== Occurrence ==
The pyramid bugle is native to in northern Europe and the Caucasus. It occurs in the mountains of central and southern Europe, and in northern and western Scandinavia. In the British Isles, it ranges down to sea level, being very rare in Ireland and otherwise occurring in Scotland and Westmoreland in England. It grows on almost neutral, preferentially rocky soils in open grassland, heathland and rock ledges. In the Alps, it grows at altitudes of up to 2,700 m (8,858 ft).

== Uses ==
The pyramid bugle, like many Ajuga species, is claimed to hold medicinal properties and has been used for wound treatment and for metabolic disorders.
