= Thomas Marsham =

English entomologist

Thomas Marsham (1748–26 November 1819) was an English entomologist, specializing on beetles.

== Biography ==
He married a Miss Symes of Ufford, Northants, and had two daughters. He was Secretary to the West India Dock Company for many years and during the Napoleonic Wars became an officer in the volunteer corps of the Home Guard in 1802. He was a founder member of the Linnean Society and its Secretary from 1788 to 1798 and Treasurer from 1798 to 1816. He was a friend of James Francis Stephens, William Kirby and Alexander Macleay .

== Works ==
- Observations on the Phalaena lubricipeda of Linnaeus and some other moths allied to it' Transactions of the Linnean Society, 1, 1791, pp. 67–75.
- System of Entomology, Hall's Royal Encyclopaedia (1788), reprinted 1796.
- Entomologia Britannica, sistens Insecta Britanniae indigena secundum Linneum deposita. Coleoptera., 1802. A collaborative work listing 1,307 species. Further voloumes on other orders were intended but never published-a common fate of early works. It is Marsham's magnum opus.
- 'Observations on the Curculio trifolii Transactions of the Linnean Society 6, 1806, pp. 142–146. (With Markwick and Lehmann);
- Some observations on an insect that destroys the wheat, supposed to be a wireworm Transactions of the Linnean Society, 9, 1808, pp. 160–161.
- Description of Notoclea, a new genus of Coleopterous insects from New Holland Transactions of the Linnean Society, 9, 1808, pp. 283–295.
- Some account of an insect of the genus Buprestis, taken alive out of wood composing a desk, which had been made above twenty years; in a letter to Mr Macleay' Transactions of the Linnean Society, 10, 1811, pp. 399–403.

== Collection ==
Marsham's collection, purchased by James Francis Stephens, is in the Natural History Museum along with some manuscripts.
