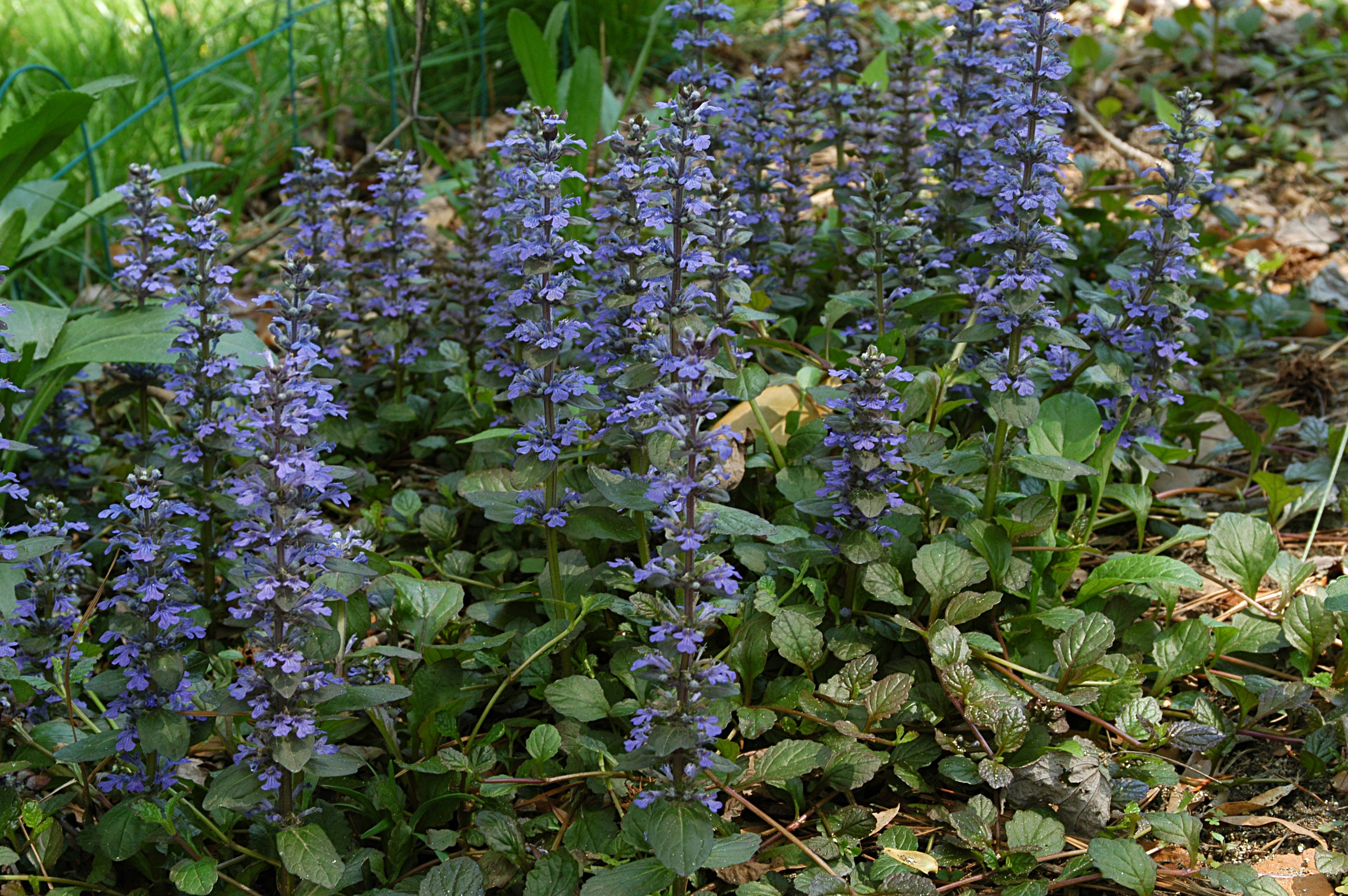

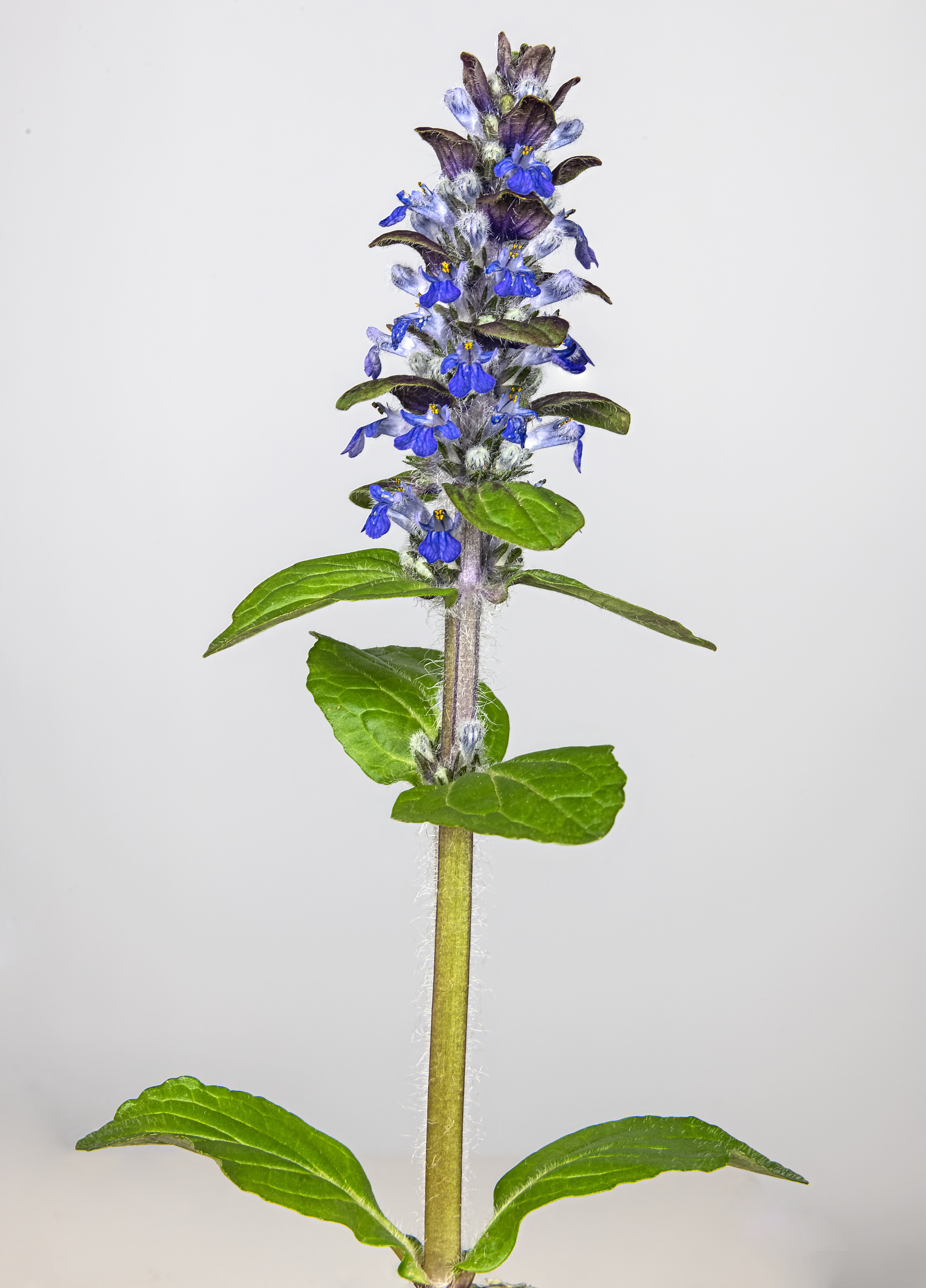

Scientific classification
- Kingdom: Plantae
- Clade: Tracheophytes
- Clade: Angiosperms
- Clade: Eudicots
- Clade: Asterids
- Order: Lamiales
- Family: Lamiaceae
- Genus: Ajuga
- Species: A. reptans

Binomial name
- Ajuga reptans L.

= Ajuga reptans =

Species of flowering plant

Ajuga reptans is commonly known as bugle, blue bugle, bugleherb, bugleweed, carpetweed, carpet bugleweed, and common bugle, and traditionally (although less commonly) as St. Lawrence plant. It is an herbaceous flowering plant in the mint family Lamiaceae, native to Europe. It is also a component of purple moor grass and rush pastures, a Biodiversity Action Plan habitat in the United Kingdom.

Ajuga reptans is a dense spreading groundcover with dark green leaves with purple highlights. The leaves grow 5–8 cm (2.0–3.1 in) tall. In spring the plant sends up 10–15 cm (3.9–5.9 in) tall flower stalks bearing many purple flowers. The flowers are frequently visited by flies, such as Rhingia campestris.

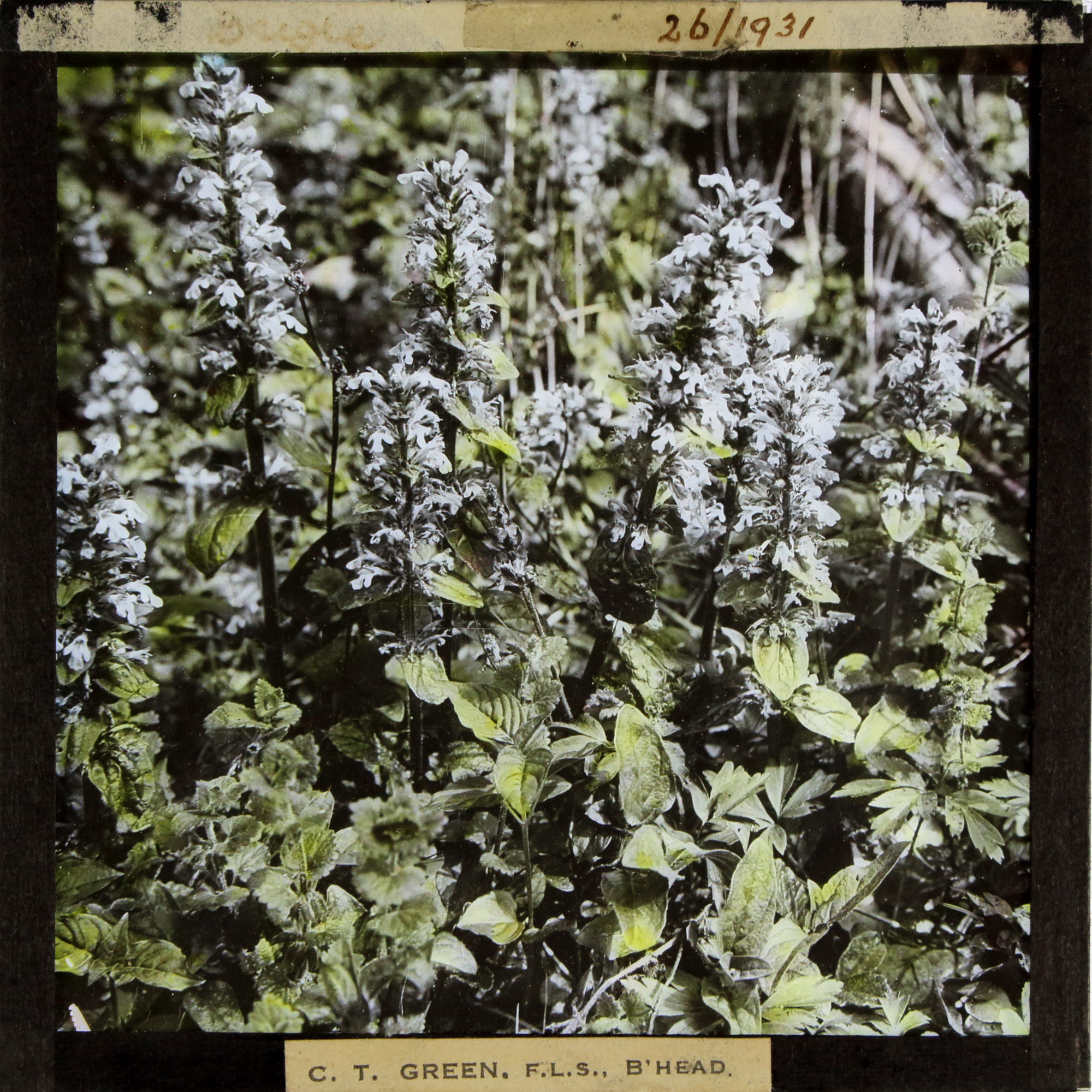
Image of a bugle by Theodore Green.

== Description ==
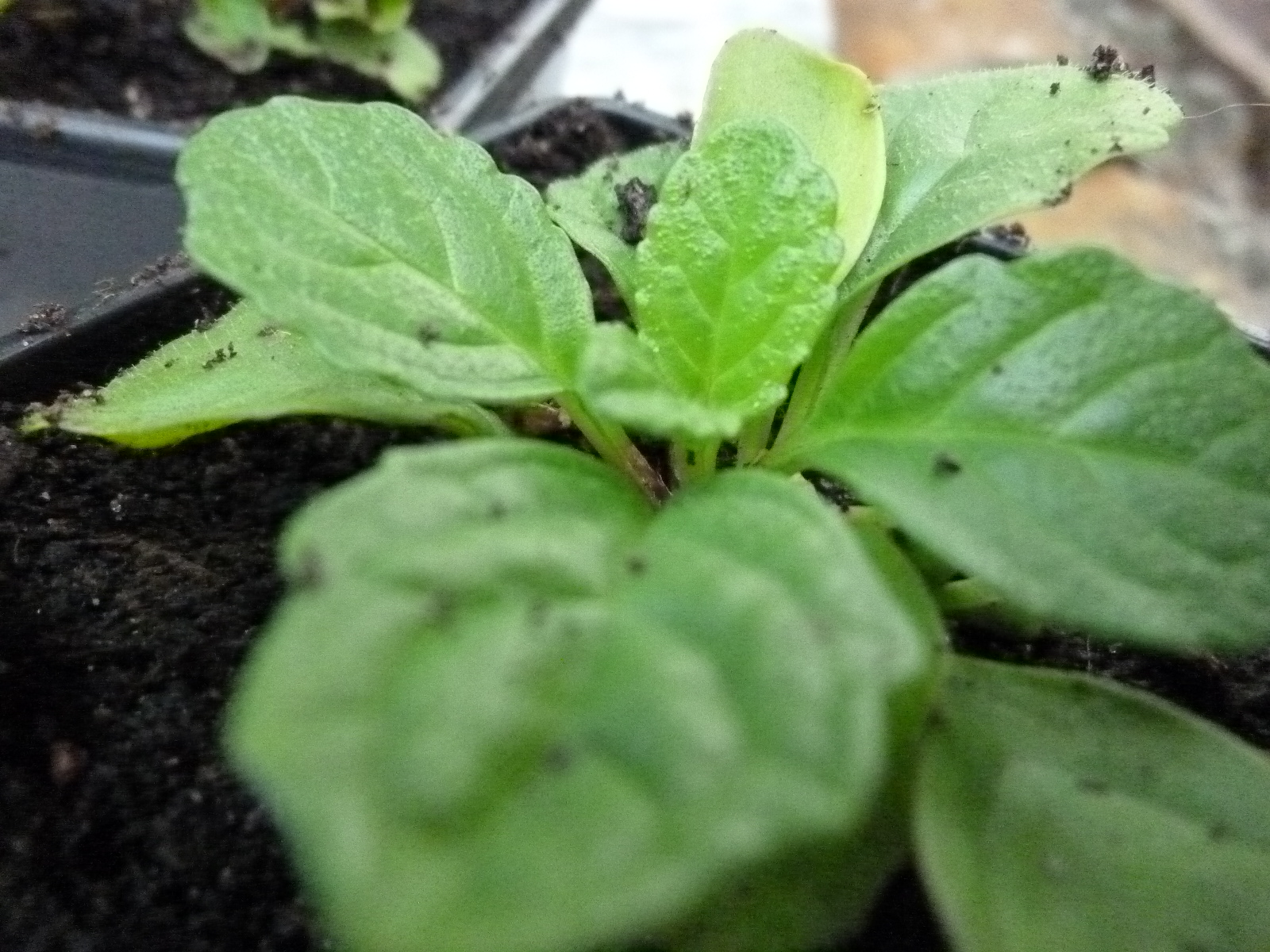
A young plant.

Ajuga reptans is a sprawling perennial herb with erect flowering stems and grows to a height of about 10 to 35 cm (4 to 14 in). The stems are square in cross-section with hairs on two sides. The plant has runners that spread across the surface of the ground. The purplish-green, stalked leaves are in opposite pairs. The leaf blades are hairless and are usually elliptical or ovate with a rounded tip and shallowly rounded teeth on the margin. The inflorescence forms a dense raceme composed of whorls of blue flowers, each with dark veins on the lower lip. The calyx has five toothed lobes and the corolla forms a two-lipped flower about 14 to 17 mm (0.6 to 0.7 in) long with a short tube. The upper lip of each flower is short and flat with a smooth edge, and the lower lip is three-lobed, the central lobe being the largest, flat with a notched tip. There are two long stamens and two short stamens, which are longer than the corolla and are attached to the tube. The ovary is superior and the fruit is a schizocarp with four chambers.

== Habitat ==
The natural habitat of Ajuga reptans spans across Europe, extending to the middle taiga subzone of northeastern Russia. The plant thrives in the understory of mixed and parvifoliate forests, benefiting from the higher soil nitrogen and lower acidity these forests provide compared to pure coniferous stands.

== Distribution ==
Common in Ireland, and throughout Great Britain.

=== Invasiveness ===
While widely used as an ornamental shade ground cover, it is considered an invasive species in various parts of the United States due to its aggressive growth and ability to form dense mats that outcompete native plants for sunlight, water, and nutrients. Its rapid spread through both seeds and underground rhizomes can lead to significant reductions in local biodiversity, particularly in woodland and garden areas. Additionally, it is often semi-evergreen to evergreen in milder climates, maintaining green cover throughout the winter.

== Pollination ==
The species is monoecious, with male and female flowers on the same plant. Pollination is by bees or Lepidoptera (moths and butterflies).

== Uses ==
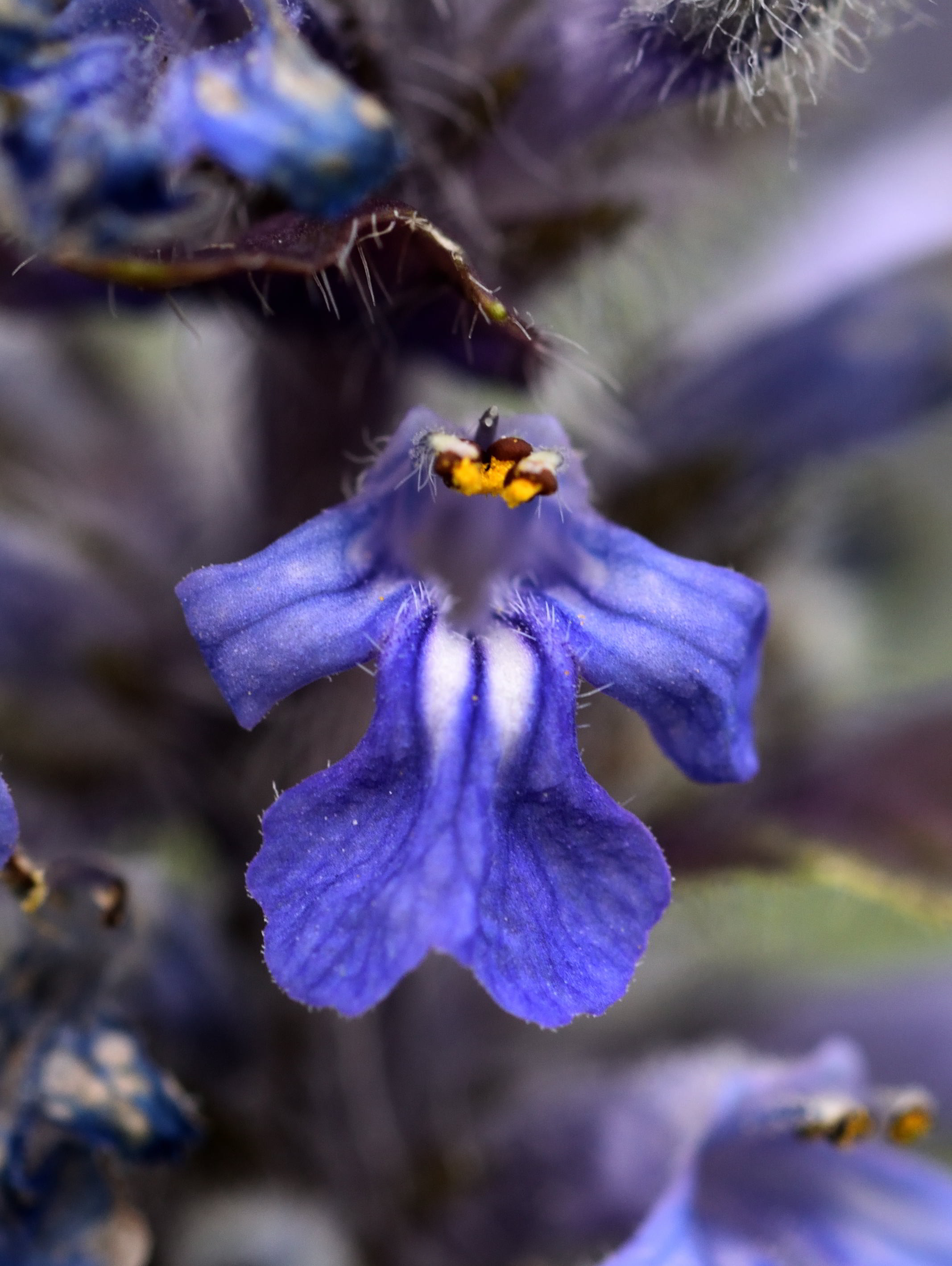
Flower

Grown as a garden plant it provides useful groundcover. Numerous cultivars have been selected, of which 'Catlin's Giant' has gained the Royal Horticultural Society's Award of Garden Merit. Ajuga reptans is also a somewhat-common foraging sight in many places where it grows. They are edible in small numbers, however as the leaves get old, they also get more bitter. They are used somewhat-commonly in salads and tea. The leaves of Ajuga reptans are also eaten raw. Bugleweed is evergreen.

Bugle is also known as "carpenter's herb" for its supposed ability to stem bleeding.

Bugle is a primary nectar source of the pearl-bordered fritillary and the small pearl-bordered fritillary. It is a secondary nectar source of the brimstone, chequered skipper, common blue, cryptic wood white, dingy skipper, Duke of Burgundy, green-veined white, grizzled skipper, heath fritillary, holly blue, large blue, large skipper, large white, marsh fritillary, orange-tip, painted lady, small white, and wood white butterflies.

Ajuga reptans herb has been used in traditional Austrian medicine internally as a tea for the treatment of disorders related to the respiratory tract.
