= Southern Tablelands Temperate Grassland =

Ecological community in New South Wales

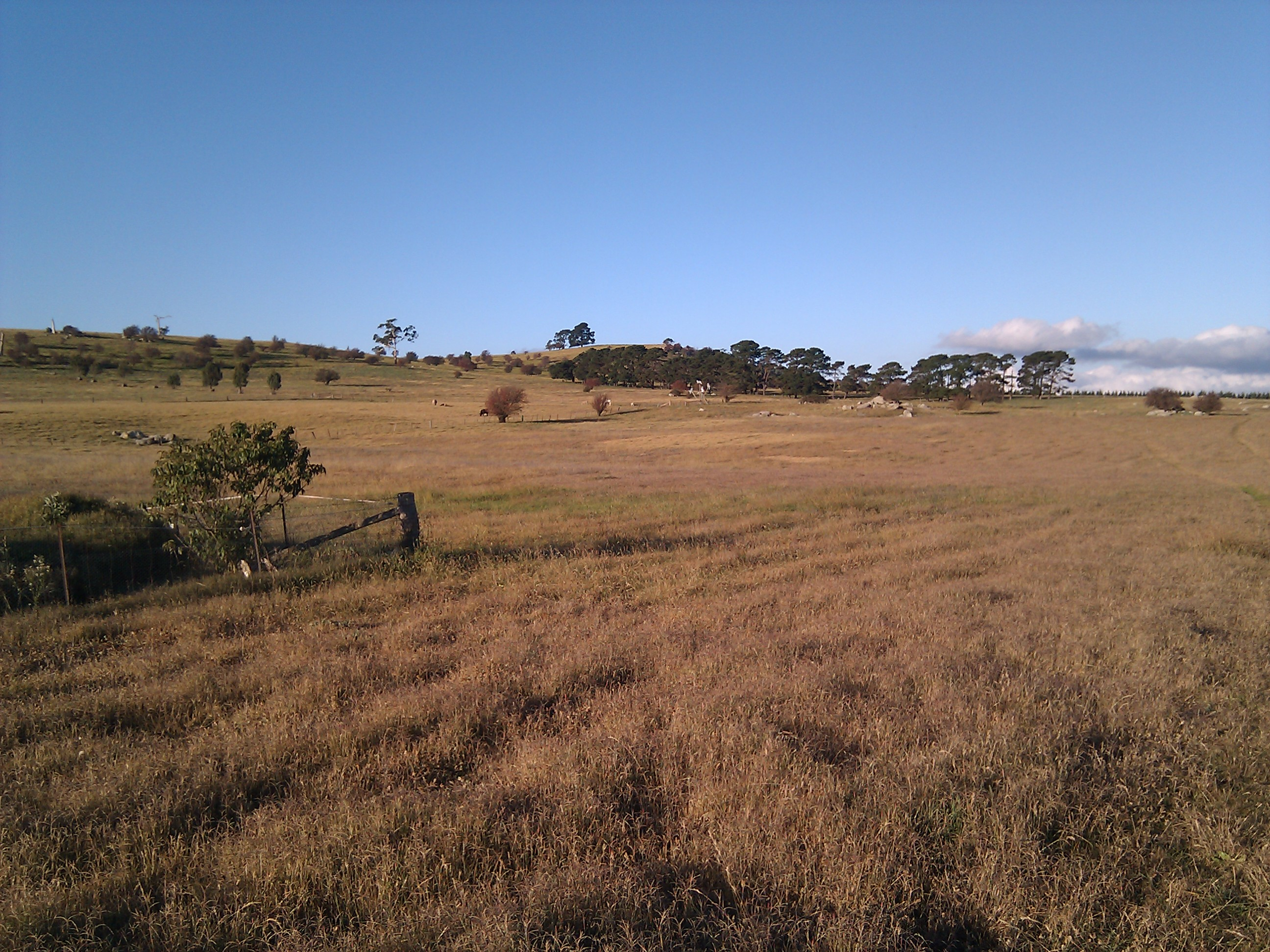

Ecology
- Realm: Australasia
- Biome: Temperate grasslands, savannas, and shrublands
- Borders: Southeast Australia temperate savanna; Northern Plains Grassland; Lowland Grassy Woodland; Coastal Valley Grassy Woodlands

Geography
- Country: Australia
- Elevation: 560–1,200 metres (1,840–3,940 ft)
- Coordinates: 34.8°S 149.52°E
- Climate type: Subtropical highland climate (Cfb)
- Soil types: Clay

The Southern Tablelands Temperate Grassland, formally Natural Temperate Grassland of the Southern Tablelands, is a temperate grassland community situated in the Southern Tablelands and Monaro region of New South Wales, extending into the Australian Capital Territory and the Victorian border. Listed as Endangered under the Environment Protection and Biodiversity Conservation Act 1999, the grassland is dominated by reasonably tall, dense to open tussock grasses.

== Geography ==
The community is commonly present in the Southern Tablelands of NSW and ACT, where it covers areas such as, Goulburn, Braidwood, Yass, Abercrombie River, Boorowa, Jindabyne, Bombala, south to the Victorian border at Delegate, on the eastern boundary of Kosciuszko National Park. The area features relatively low rainfall between 560 and 1200 metres in altitude, with low nutrient, highly textured soils on the valleys and low slopes (which grade with grassy woodland), and on the wider plains.

20 000 ha of natural temperate grassland was present in the ACT prior to European settlement and in NSW around 450 000 ha of grassland occurred. In the ACT there are four reserved sites that comprise a total area of 206 ha of grassland and in NSW there are two proposed nature reserves totaling around 200 ha. The region lies on broad plains with poor drainage and features cold air inversions that encourages frosts which suppresses tree growth. The scattered community is bounded by the Snowy Mountains and Brindabella Range in the southwest, with he northwestern boundary passing from Burrinjuck Dam and to the Lachlan River and north to Wyangala Dam.

== Ecology ==
The area predominantly features moderately tall (25-50 cm) to tall (50 cm-1 m), thick to open tussock grasses, such as Bothriochloa macra, Themeda australis, Austrodanthonia spp., Austrostipa and Poa spp with up to 70% of the species being forbs, which are namely daisies, lilies and native legumes. The grassland is generally treeless, though trees may be present in low densities (10%), either as sporadic individuals or in clusters, with the main tree species being Eucalyptus melliodora. Herbs, wildflowers and forbs species include:

- Asperula conferta
- Ajuga australis
- Brachyloma daphnoides
- Bulbine bulbosa
- Carex inversa
- Cheilanthes austrotenuifolia
- Chrysocephalum apiculatum
- Convolvulus erubescens
- Craspedia variabilis
- Cryptandra amara
- Cymbonotus lawsonianus
- Daviesia genistifolia
- Desmodium varians
- Dichondra repens
- Dillwynia glaucula
- Diuris chryseopsis
- Diuris pedunculata
- Dodonaea procumbens
- Eryngium ovinum
- Geranium solanderi
- Hakea microcarpa
- Hibbertia obtusifolia
- Hymenanthera dentata
- Leucochrysum albicans
- Lissanthe strigosa
- Lomandra filiformis
- Melichrus urceolatus
- Microtis unifolia
- Prasophyllum petilum
- Rutidosis leptorrhynchoides
- Schoenus apogon
- Wahlenbergia communis
- Wurmbea dioica

=== Animals ===
- Aprasia parapulchella
- Coturnix ypsilophora
- Delma impar
- Gallinago hardwickii
- Lampropholis delicata
- Microseris lanceolata
- Neobatrachus sudelli
- Suta flagellum
- Synemon plana
- Tympanocryptis pinguicolla
