= Coastal Valley Grassy Woodlands =

Australian grassy woodland vegetation class

- The Bega Valley, with open grassy woodlands visible across the valley floor, as viewed from Brown Mountain, New South Wales.

Ecology
- Realm: Australasia
- Biome: Temperate grasslands, savannas, and shrublands

Geography
- Country: Australia
- State: New South Wales, Queensland, Victoria
- Elevation: 0–350 metres (0–1,148 ft)
- Geology: Shale, granite and associated sedimentary and igneous substrates
- Climate type: Humid subtropical and oceanic
- Soil types: Deep, moderately fertile loam and clay loam

Coastal Valley Grassy Woodlands are a class of grassy woodland (i.e. savannas) occurring principally in the coastal valleys and plains of eastern Australia. They are characterised by an open canopy of eucalypts and related trees above a species-rich ground layer dominated by perennial tussock grasses, herbs and other herbaceous plants. Shrubs may be scattered or locally form denser patches. The composition and structure of the woodlands vary in response to rainfall, soil fertility, topography, fire and disturbance. Fire is an important ecological influence on the vegetation.

Coastal Valley Grassy Woodlands occur primarily on relatively fertile soils in comparatively dry valleys and plains on the coastal side of the Great Dividing Range, where local rain shadow effects restrict the development of wetter forest types. Despite sharing a characteristic grassy woodland structure, these Grassy Woodlands are floristically heterogeneous across their geographical range. The Grassy Woodlands have been extensively cleared and modified throughout their range. Human disturbance has substantially altered the ecology of many surviving remnants. In New South Wales, occurrences are distributed discontinuously from the northern river valleys to the South Coast, including the Cumberland Plain of Western Sydney. Cumberland Plain Woodland, a critically endangered ecological community, forms one of the best-known regional expressions of the broader Coastal Valley Grassy Woodlands.

== Description ==
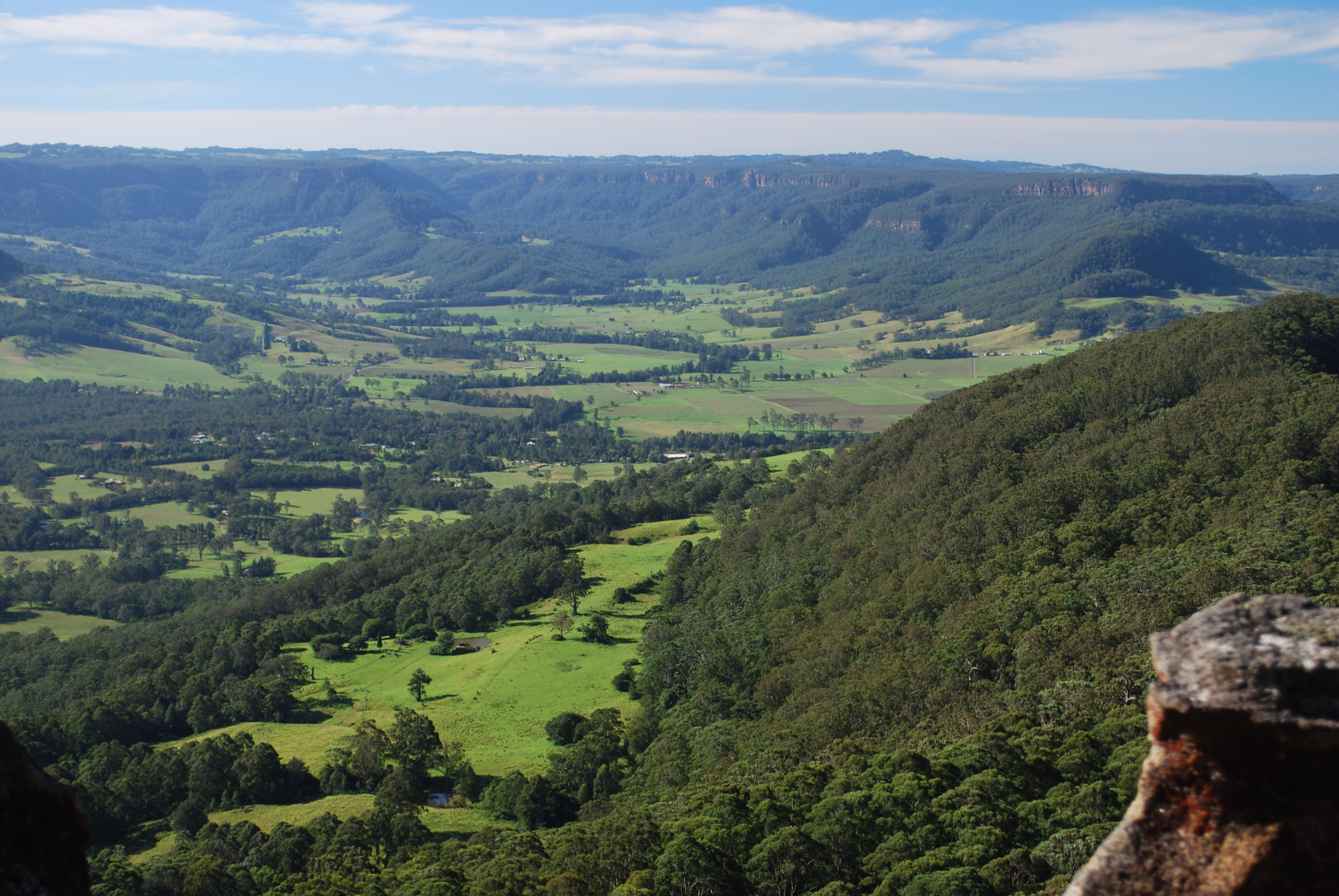
Open grassy vegetation and scattered trees in Kangaroo Valley, one of the valleys in which Coastal Valley Grassy Woodlands occur.

Coastal Valley Grassy Woodlands generally take the form of open forest or woodland approximately 20 to 35 m (66 to 115 ft) tall. The canopy is typically discontinuous, allowing substantial light to reach the understorey and supporting a dense and species-rich herbaceous layer. Beneath the canopy, shrubs occur as scattered individuals or clumps and are predominantly sclerophyllous, although their density varies considerably according to site quality and disturbance history. The ground layer is characteristically dense and species-rich, comprising perennial tussock grasses, herbs and scrambling or climbing plants. Geophytic orchids and lilies may become particularly conspicuous during favourable seasons or following fire.

The structure of the vegetation varies across its range. Some communities form relatively tall open forests, whereas others have a more open, park-like woodland structure with widely spaced trees and a predominantly grassy ground layer. Tree density may also have been substantially reduced in areas historically subjected to clearing or grazing. At the southern end of the range, some communities assigned to Coastal Valley Grassy Woodlands may naturally contain relatively few trees or locally occur without a tree canopy.

The vegetation class encompasses numerous regionally distinct plant communities that have been described under a variety of names. In the Cumberland Plain, these include Cumberland Shale Plains Woodland and Cumberland Shale-Sandstone Ironbark Forest, while the Hunter Valley includes Central Hunter Ironbark-Spotted Gum Forest. Northern New South Wales examples include Northern Hinterland Valleys Red Gum Grassy Forest and Far North Ranges Red Gum Grassy Forest. In southern New South Wales, communities within the class have historically been described under names including Bega Dry Grass Forest, Candelo Dry Grass Forest, Bega Valley Shrub/Grass Forest, South Coast Grassy Woodland and Far South Coast Grassy Woodland. These names represent different classifications of vegetation now included, wholly or partly, within Lowland Grassy Woodland in the South East Corner Bioregion, which belongs to the Coastal Valley Grassy Woodlands class.

=== Canopy ===
Rough-barked apple (Angophora floribunda) and forest red gum (Eucalyptus tereticornis) are among the most characteristic trees of the vegetation class and occur throughout much of its geographical range. Other widespread canopy species include spotted gum (Corymbia maculata), narrow-leaved ironbark (Eucalyptus crebra), thin-leaved stringybark (Eucalyptus eugenioides) and grey box (Eucalyptus moluccana).

Canopy composition changes substantially with latitude and locality. In the far north, large-leaved spotted gum (Corymbia henryi), pink bloodwood (Corymbia intermedia) and grey ironbark (Eucalyptus siderophloia) become characteristic components. In the Hunter Valley, communities may instead be dominated by combinations of narrow-leaved ironbark, spotted gum, grey box and forest red gum. On the Cumberland Plain, forest red gum and grey box are particularly characteristic, with ironbarks locally prominent. Farther south, grassy woodlands of the Bega Valley and surrounding lowlands commonly contain forest red gum, while rough-barked apple, yellow box (Eucalyptus melliodora) and snow gum (Eucalyptus pauciflora) may occur in some stands.

=== Understorey ===
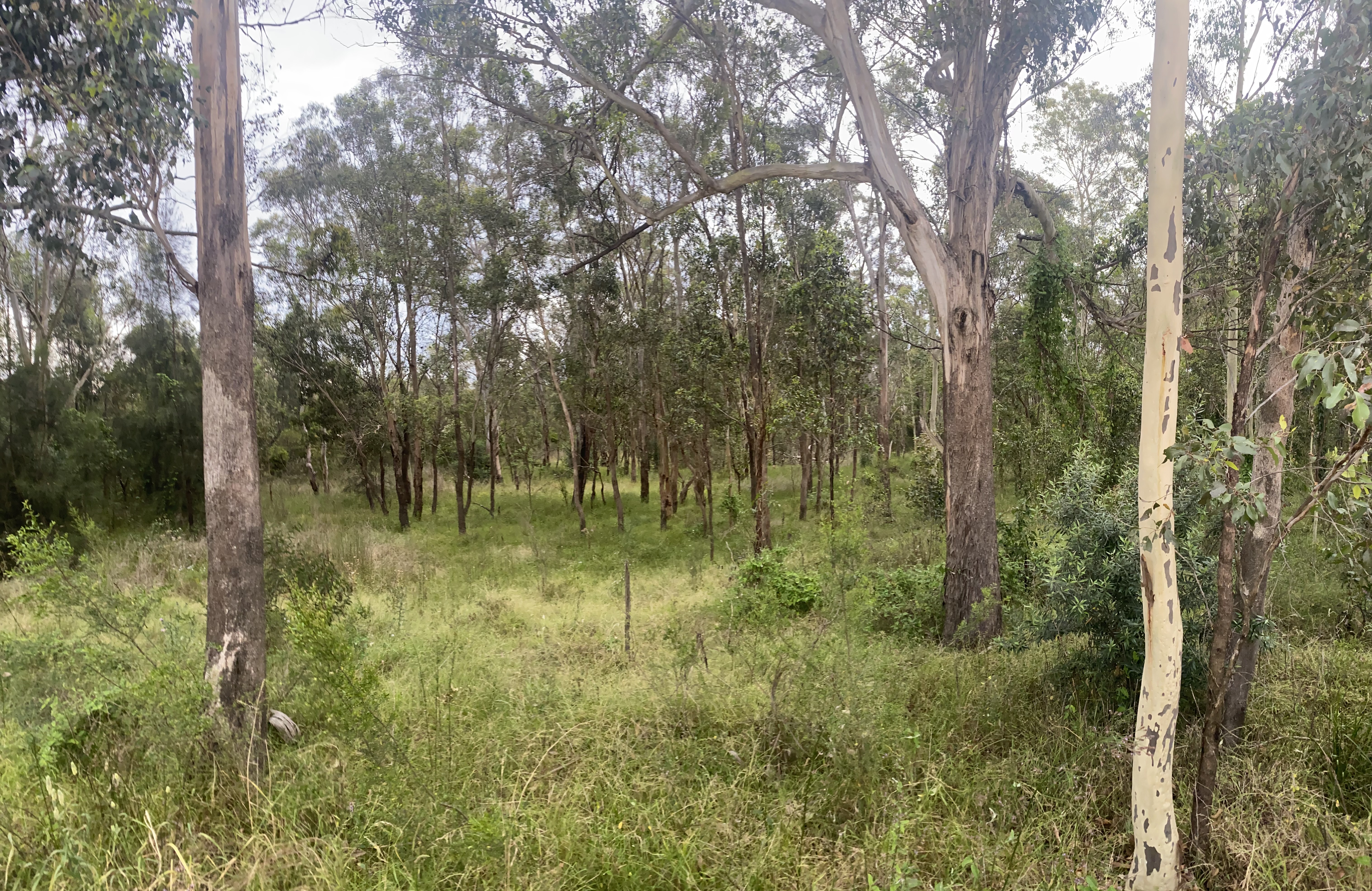
Mixed grassy and shrubby understorey of Cumberland Plain Woodland at Cessna Reserve.

The shrub layer is generally less prominent than the grassy ground layer and varies considerably between communities. Blackthorn (Bursaria spinosa) is among the most widespread shrubs, while other sclerophyllous shrubs occur according to region, substrate and disturbance history. Some communities, particularly grassy open forests of the Hunter Valley, may have only a sparse shrub layer or lack one almost entirely. Grasses and other herbaceous plants provide much of the vegetation cover beneath the trees. Dominant tussock grasses occurring widely within the class include purple wiregrass (Aristida ramosa), threeawn speargrass (Aristida vagans), barbed-wire grass (Cymbopogon refractus), paddock lovegrass (Eragrostis leptostachya) and kangaroo grass (Themeda triandra). Smaller grasses and sedges include knob sedge (Carex inversa), Dichelachne micrantha and weeping grass (Microlaena stipoides).

The relative abundance of these species varies geographically. Kangaroo grass and weeping grass, for example, are important components of Lowland Grassy Woodland in the South East Corner, where they occur beneath forest red gum and other scattered eucalypts. The prominence of grasses and herbs throughout the class distinguishes these communities from neighbouring forests in which shrubs or a denser tree canopy form a greater proportion of the vegetation.

=== Floristic variation ===
Despite their common structural characteristics, Coastal Valley Grassy Woodlands are not floristically uniform. Their discontinuous distribution in separate coastal valleys has produced a series of regionally distinctive assemblages. Quantitative comparisons have found that Coastal Valley Grassy Woodlands in different regions of New South Wales are floristically distinct and support substantial numbers of locally restricted or endemic species. Regional assemblages are often distinct and may contain substantial numbers of locally restricted species. Their similarities are largely attributable to a comparatively small group of widespread and abundant plants that contribute strongly to the characteristic appearance of the vegetation, while representing only a small proportion of its total floristic diversity.

Floristic diversity also displays a strong latitudinal pattern, with overall diversity declining towards the south, particularly among woody species. Similarities between geographically separated variants are largely attributable to a comparatively small group of widespread and abundant species. These plants contribute strongly to the characteristic appearance of Coastal Valley Grassy Woodlands but represent only a small proportion of their total floristic diversity. Consequently, woodlands separated by several hundred kilometres may share a recognisable open eucalypt canopy and grassy understorey while differing substantially in their complete assemblages of trees, shrubs, grasses and herbs.

== Distribution and environment ==
Satellite image of eastern New South Wales during the 2019–20 bushfire season, showing the coastal valleys and plains where Coastal Valley Grassy Woodlands occur.

In New South Wales they generally occur below 350 m (1,150 ft), in areas receiving approximately 700 to 1,000 mm (28 to 39 in) of annual rainfall. They are particularly associated with coastal rain shadows, where lower rainfall and relatively fertile soils favour grassy woodland rather than the denser forests characteristic of many wetter parts of the eastern seaboard. Typical substrates include relatively deep and moderately fertile clay and loam soils derived principally from shale and granite.

In New South Wales, the class occurs in the valleys of the Clarence, Macleay, Manning and Hunter rivers; the Kangaroo, Moruya, Araluen and Bega Valleys; and on the Cumberland Plain and south-western Illawarra plain. A localised occurrence is also recognised around the Gippsland Lakes in Victoria. Tozer's broader treatment places Coastal Valley Grassy Woodlands throughout coastal New South Wales and into South East Queensland. The environments occupied by the class vary considerably over this geographical range. Northern examples occur in warm subtropical valleys and hinterlands, whereas the southernmost occurrences experience cooler temperate conditions. Differences in rainfall, temperature, geology and soil fertility contribute to substantial regional variation in floristic composition, despite the persistence of a broadly similar open-canopy and grassy structure.

The vegetation class encompasses numerous plant communities that differ according to climate, geology and geography. Examples recognised in contemporary New South Wales vegetation classification include Cumberland Shale Plains Woodland and Cumberland Shale-Sandstone Ironbark Forest on the Cumberland Plain, Central Hunter Ironbark-Spotted Gum Forest in the Hunter region, Northern Hinterland Valleys Red Gum Grassy Forest on the North Coast, and Southeast Lowland Grassy Woodland in south-eastern New South Wales. Although grouped within the same vegetation class, these regional forms are not simply geographical repetitions of a single plant community. Comparative analysis has found considerable floristic differentiation among Coastal Valley Grassy Woodlands, with many species restricted to particular portions of the geographical range. Their common classification reflects a combination of structural, environmental and floristic characteristics, including the prevalence of an open eucalypt canopy and a substantial grassy and herbaceous ground layer.

=== Northern New South Wales and South East Queensland ===
At the northern end of the range, Coastal Valley Grassy Woodlands occur in the coastal and hinterland valleys of northern New South Wales, including parts of the Clarence Valley. Communities assigned to the class include Northern Hinterland Valleys Red Gum Grassy Forest and Far North Ranges Red Gum Grassy Forest. Forest red gum (Eucalyptus tereticornis) remains an important canopy species in northern examples, while subtropical trees such as large-leaved spotted gum (Corymbia henryi), pink bloodwood (Corymbia intermedia) and grey ironbark (Eucalyptus siderophloia) become increasingly characteristic towards the northern end of the distribution. The broader Coastal Valley Grassy Woodland assemblage extends beyond the New South Wales border into South East Queensland. This northern extension occupies the warmer end of the climatic gradient represented by the vegetation class and contributes to the greater woody-plant diversity recorded in its northern communities.

=== Hunter Valley ===
Vineyards in the Hunter Valley, with patches of remnant grassy woodland vegetation among the agricultural landscape.

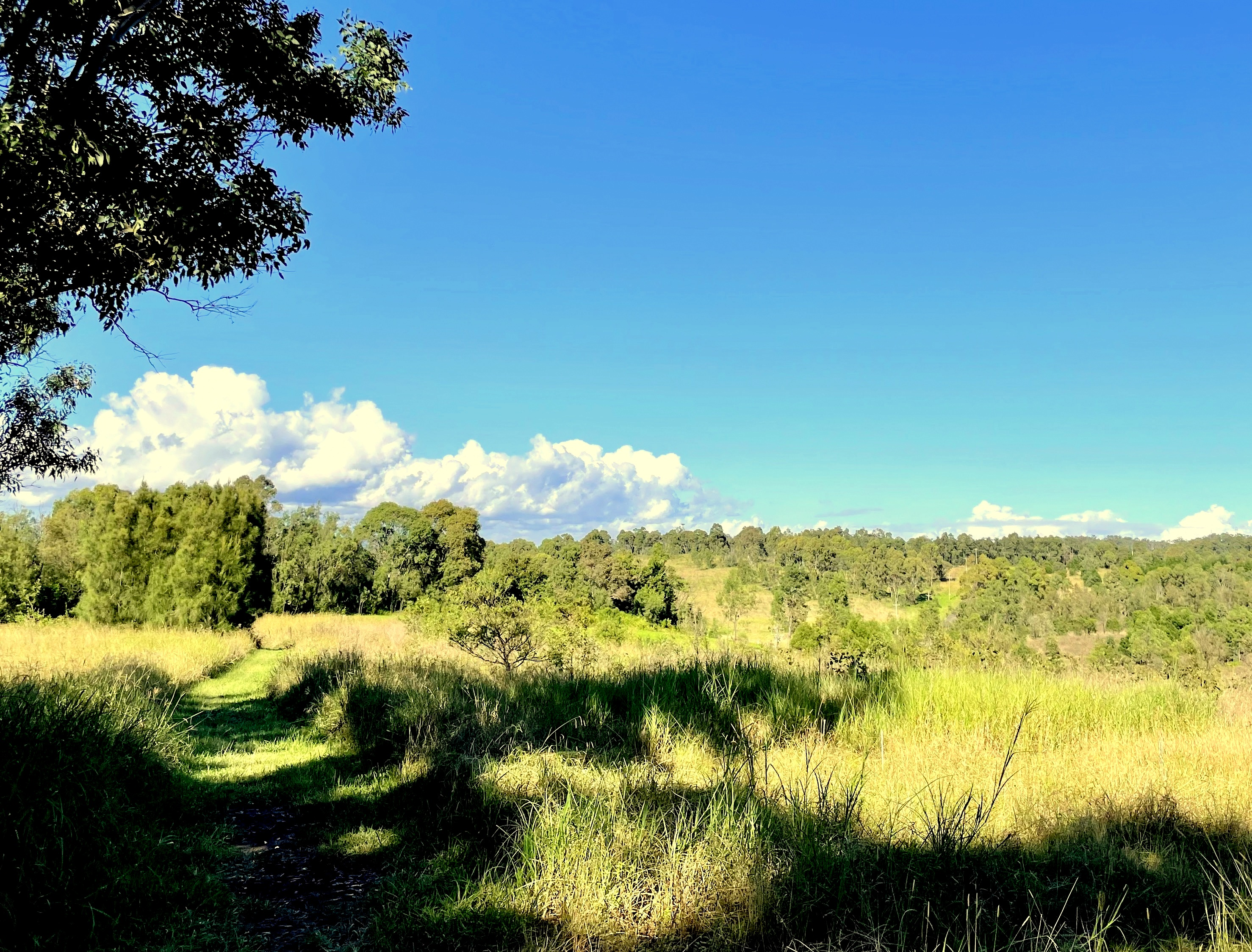
Cumberland Plain Woodland, showing its characteristic open eucalypt woodland and grassy ground layer.

The Hunter Valley contains an extensive and distinctive expression of Coastal Valley Grassy Woodlands. The valley lies within a pronounced coastal rain shadow and supports grassy eucalypt forests and woodlands on relatively fertile soils. Characteristic trees include narrow-leaved ironbark (Eucalyptus crebra), spotted gum (Corymbia maculata), grey box (Eucalyptus moluccana) and forest red gum (Eucalyptus tereticornis). Several Hunter Valley communities are included within the class, including Central Hunter Ironbark-Spotted Gum Forest. Some of these communities form part of the nationally listed Central Hunter Valley eucalypt forest and woodland ecological community. The natural vegetation of the valley has been extensively modified by agriculture, grazing, mining and settlement, leaving much of the remaining grassy woodland fragmented within a predominantly modified landscape.

=== Cumberland Plain ===
On the Cumberland Plain of the Sydney Basin, Coastal Valley Grassy Woodlands include Cumberland Plain Woodland and related grassy woodland communities. The gently undulating shale plains of Western Sydney historically supported extensive open grassy woodland dominated in many areas by grey box, forest red gum and ironbarks, with sparse to moderate shrub cover and a high cover of grasses and forbs. Situated in Sydney, the Cumberland Plain occupies a distinctive climatic and ecological position within the broader class. Its relatively low rainfall compared with the adjacent coastal and elevated areas contributes to the development of grassy woodland on the plain. Quantitative comparisons of Coastal Valley Grassy Woodlands across New South Wales found that Cumberland Plain Woodland supports species and assemblages not replicated in other regions of the state, despite sharing a general physiognomy and a number of widespread species with other coastal-valley grassy woodlands.

=== Illawarra and South Coast ===
Coastal Valley Grassy Woodlands occur on the Illawarra lowlands and in a series of valleys and plains extending southward along the South Coast. These include the south-western Illawarra plain, Kangaroo Valley, Moruya, Araluen and the Bega Valley. Plant communities assigned to the class in this region include Illawarra Lowland Red Gum Grassy Forest, South Coast Low Hills Red Gum Grassy Forest, South Coast Lowland Woollybutt Grassy Forest and Southeast Lowland Grassy Woodland. The southern communities generally have lower woody-plant diversity than their northern counterparts and include species characteristic of cooler south-eastern Australia. Lowland Grassy Woodland in the South East Corner, for example, occurs on lowland plains and gently undulating terrain and may range structurally from open eucalypt woodland to areas in which the tree layer is sparse or locally absent.

=== Victoria ===
The southernmost occurrence attributed to Coastal Valley Grassy Woodlands is geographically isolated from the principal New South Wales distribution. The vegetation class has been recorded locally around the Gippsland Lakes in eastern Victoria. The surrounding Gippsland also supports extensive grassy woodland vegetation classified under Victoria's separate Ecological Vegetation Class system; these Victorian classifications should not necessarily be regarded as equivalent to the Coastal Valley Grassy Woodlands class used in the New South Wales vegetation classification.

== Ecology ==
Kangaroo grass (Themeda triandra) is a characteristic component of the herbaceous ground layer of many Coastal Valley Grassy Woodlands.

Perennial tussock grasses and herbs form much of the ground cover, accompanied by smaller grasses, sedges, scrambling plants and geophytes. In favourable seasons, and particularly following fire, the ground layer may experience conspicuous flushes of geophytic orchids and lilies. The grassy ground layer, together with fallen eucalypt litter, provides a relatively continuous layer of fine fuel through which surface fires can spread. The comparatively sparse shrub layer and open arrangement of trees generally provide less vertical fuel continuity than occurs in shrubby forests, although vegetation structure varies considerably between sites and with disturbance history. Fire can also influence the composition and seasonal appearance of the ground flora, with some orchids, lilies and other herbaceous plants becoming particularly conspicuous after fire.

The class is principally associated with relatively deep and moderately fertile soils in coastal rain shadows, and these environmental conditions distinguish it from many of the more densely forested communities of the wetter coastal ranges. Local disturbance histories, including grazing, clearing and pasture modification, may substantially alter the density and composition of the understorey. Species composition also displays a strong latitudinal gradient, with plant diversity generally declining towards the south, particularly among woody species. The ground flora has affinities with grassy woodlands of the tablelands and western slopes of New South Wales. Some widespread canopy and ground-layer species occur across widely separated examples of the class, while other species are restricted to particular regions. Consequently, communities on the Cumberland Plain, Hunter Valley, northern coastal valleys and the South Coast may have a broadly similar physiognomy while differing considerably in their detailed floristic composition. Coastal Valley Grassy Woodlands have been extensively cleared for pastoral and agricultural use, and remaining grassy woodlands frequently occur as small and fragmented remnants. Pasture improvement, overgrazing, weed invasion and soil disturbance can reduce the diversity of the native ground layer and favour introduced species.

== Conservation ==
Cattle grazing near Wolumla in the Bega Valley. Agricultural clearing and grazing have extensively modified grassy woodland landscapes in the coastal valleys.

Their occurrence on relatively fertile soils and generally level to gently undulating terrain made many areas particularly suitable for agriculture, grazing and, subsequently, urban and industrial development. As a result, much of the original vegetation has been replaced by pasture, cropland and urban development, while surviving woodland is frequently fragmented into relatively small remnants. Grassy woodland remnants may persist on travelling stock reserves, roadsides, cemeteries, public reserves and other sites that escaped intensive land clearing.

The extent of loss varies regionally but is particularly severe in some of the major coastal valleys and plains. On the Cumberland Plain, Cumberland Plain Woodland has been extensively cleared for agriculture and the expansion of Western Sydney, leaving a highly fragmented distribution. Remaining stands continue to be affected by development, infrastructure, weed invasion, altered nutrient levels and inappropriate fire regimes. In the Hunter Valley, the nationally listed Central Hunter Valley eucalypt forest and woodland has declined by more than 70 per cent from its estimated pre-European extent and now has a highly fragmented and restricted distribution.

Substantial losses have also occurred farther south. Large areas of Illawarra Lowlands Grassy Woodland have been cleared, and most surviving examples are small and fragmented; some consist primarily of regrowth following earlier clearing or other disturbance. Lowland Grassy Woodland in the South East Corner Bioregion, including grassy woodlands of the Bega Valley and other southern coastal valleys, is also listed as an endangered ecological community in New South Wales. A number of ecological communities belonging to the Coastal Valley Grassy Woodlands class are therefore formally recognised as threatened under state or national legislation. Cumberland Plain Woodland is listed as critically endangered in New South Wales, while Lowland Grassy Woodland in the South East Corner Bioregion and Illawarra Lowlands Grassy Woodland are listed as endangered. The Central Hunter Valley eucalypt forest and woodland was listed as critically endangered under the Commonwealth Environment Protection and Biodiversity Conservation Act 1999 in May 2015.

Continued clearing and fragmentation remain major threats to surviving Coastal Valley Grassy Woodlands. Fragmentation reduces the size and connectivity of remnants and can impair ecological processes, while small remnants are particularly exposed to disturbances originating in surrounding agricultural and urban land. In Cumberland Plain Woodland, for example, historical clearing has produced severe fragmentation, with many surviving patches occupying only small areas. Other threats include livestock grazing and pasture improvement, weed invasion, altered fire regimes, soil disturbance and nutrient enrichment, rubbish dumping, recreational disturbance and further residential, industrial and infrastructure development. These pressures can alter the characteristic grassy and herbaceous understorey even where an overstorey of mature trees remains, meaning that the persistence of scattered trees alone does not necessarily indicate the survival of an intact grassy woodland community.

== Structural analogues ==
The characteristic combination of a relatively open tree canopy and a predominantly grassy or herbaceous ground layer is not unique to eastern Australia. Vegetation with a broadly comparable physical structure occurs in several other climatic and biogeographical regions, although these ecosystems differ substantially in species composition, evolutionary history and ecology.

In the Iberian Peninsula, the dehesa is an open woodland or wooded grassland characterised by scattered trees, principally oaks, above a herbaceous ground layer. Typical dehesa may contain shrubs at varying densities. At one extensively studied dehesa in western Spain, scattered evergreen oaks form approximately 20 per cent tree cover above a continuous herbaceous layer. Unlike Australian Coastal Valley Grassy Woodlands, however, dehesas are silvopastoral landscapes whose present structure has been strongly influenced by long-term human management. In the eastern Mediterranean, Tabor oak (Quercus ithaburensis) forms open woodland or park-forest in parts of Israel and north-western Jordan. These woodlands are characterised by dispersed oak trees and an abundant herbaceous layer, and substantial examples occur in the Lower Galilee, Golan and the Jordanian plateau west of Irbid.

Open-canopy vegetation of comparable general physiognomy is also widespread in African savanna and woodland regions. In South Sudan (i.e. Sudanian savanna), vegetation mapping distinguishes savanna with 10–30 per cent tree-canopy cover from woodland with 30–50 per cent canopy cover; these open woody vegetation classes occupy extensive areas of the country. These similarities are principally structural: Coastal Valley Grassy Woodlands are dominated by an Australian flora, particularly Eucalyptus, Corymbia and Angophora, and the regional communities within the class are floristically distinct even from one another.

== See also ==
- Cumberland Plain Woodland
- Temperate grasslands, savannas, and shrublands
- Eastern Australian temperate forests
