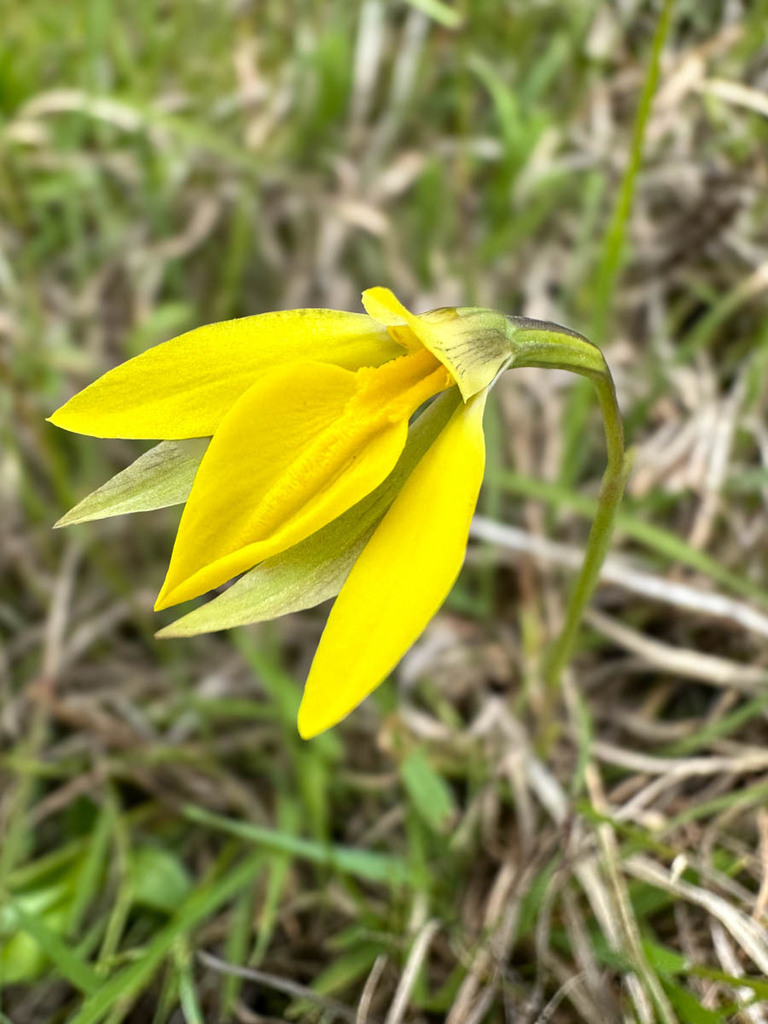
- Near Cathedral Rock National Park

Conservation status
- Endangered (EPBC Act)

Scientific classification
- Kingdom: Plantae
- Clade: Embryophytes
- Clade: Tracheophytes
- Clade: Angiosperms
- Clade: Monocots
- Order: Asparagales
- Family: Orchidaceae
- Subfamily: Orchidoideae
- Tribe: Diurideae
- Genus: Diuris
- Species: D. pedunculata

Binomial name
- Diuris pedunculata R.Br.

Synonyms
- Diuris pedunculata R.Br. var. pedunculata; Diuris pallens Benth.

= Diuris pedunculata =

Small snake orchid

Species of orchid

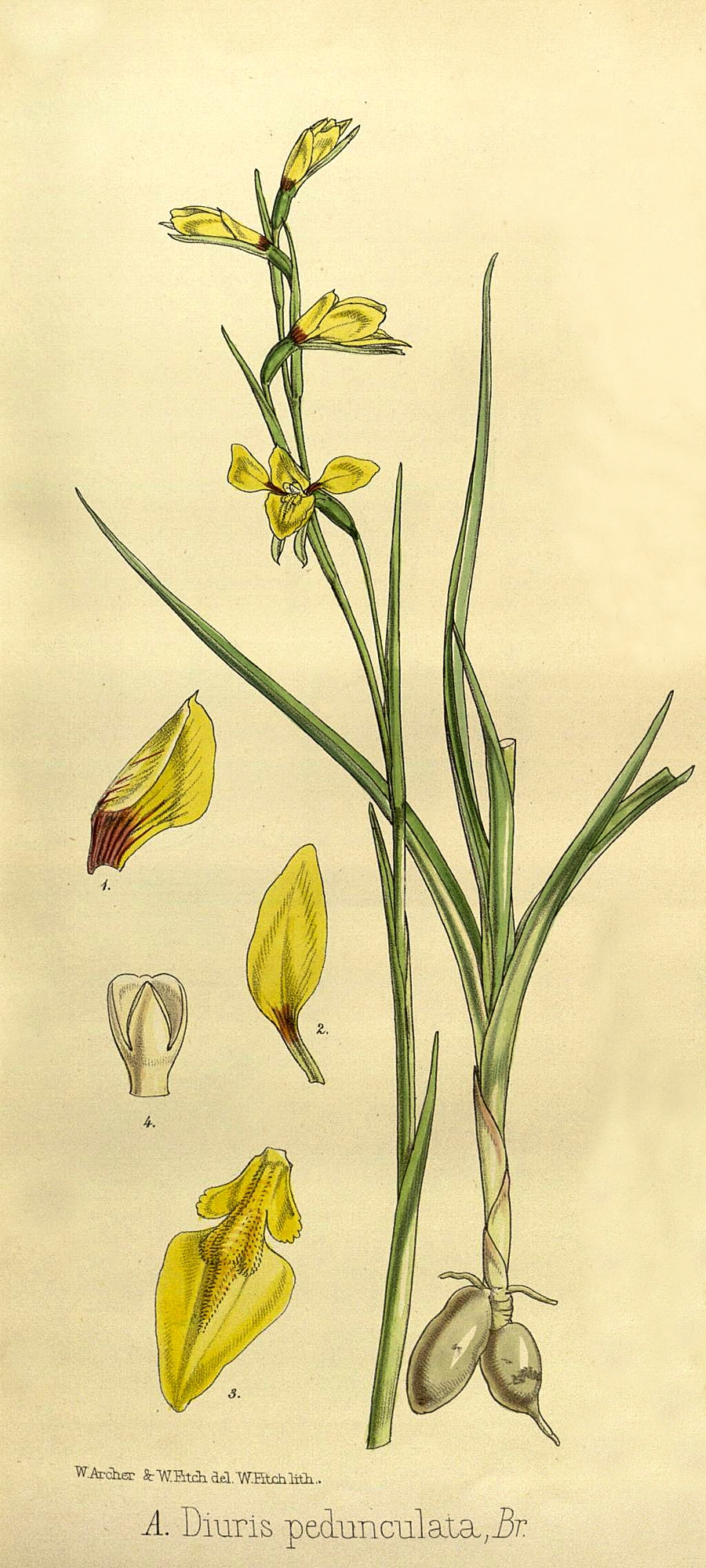
Illustration in Hooker's Flora Antarctica

Diuris pedunculata, commonly known as the small snake orchid, is a species of orchid which is endemic to New South Wales. It usually has two leaves at its base and one or two yellow and orange flowers with purple markings. It originally occurred in scattered populations between Tenterfield and the Hawkesbury River but because of habitat loss is now only known from the New England Tableland.

== Description ==
Diuris pedunculata is a tuberous, perennial herb with two erect, linear to thread-like leaves 40–120 mm (2–5 in) long and 1–2 mm (0.04–0.08 in) wide. One or two pale yellow flowers with an orange labellum, 15–20 mm (0.6–0.8 in) wide are borne on a flowering stem 60–180 mm (2–7 in) tall. The dorsal sepal is narrow egg-shaped, angled upwards, 7–10 mm (0.3–0.4 in) long and 5–6 mm (0.20–0.24 in) wide. The lateral sepals are lance-shaped with the narrower end towards the base, 15–20 mm (0.6–0.8 in) long, about 3 mm (0.1 in) wide and angled downwards. The petals are narrow elliptic, 9–14 mm (0.4–0.6 in) long, 4–5.5 mm (0.16–0.22 in) wide, spread apart from each other and droop downwards on a dark coloured stalk 2–3 mm (0.08–0.1 in) long. The labellum is 14–16 mm (0.55–0.63 in) long and has three lobes. The centre lobe is broadly egg-shaped, 7–10 mm (0.3–0.4 in) wide and the side lobes are triangular, about 2 mm (0.08 in) long and 1 mm (0.04 in) wide. There are between two irregular ridge-like calli 5–7 mm (0.2–0.3 in) long at the base of the mid-line of the labellum. Flowering occurs in August and September.

== Taxonomy and naming ==
Diuris pedunculata was first described in 1810 by Robert Brown and the description was published in his Prodromus Florae Novae Hollandiae et Insulae Van Diemen. The specific epithet (pedunculata) is a Latin word meaning "small, slender stalk".

== Distribution and habitat ==
The small snake orchid was originally found in scattered populations between Tenterfield and the Hawkesbury River but is now only known mostly from areas around Armidale, Uralla, Guyra and Ebor. It grows in moist, grassy places and in open forest.

Similar orchids occurring in south-east New South Wales, the Australian Capital Territory, Victoria and Tasmania have been reinterpreted as Diuris subalpina.

== Ecology ==
This orchid appears use sexual deception, attracting mostly males of the native bee species, Halictus lanuginosus for pollination, even though the flowers produce nectar and emit a strong scent that attract other insects.

== Conservation status ==
Diuris pedunculata is listed as "endangered" under the Australian Government Environment Protection and Biodiversity Conservation Act 1999 and under the New South Wales Biodiversity Conservation Act 2016. The main threats to the species include habitat loss and fragmentation, grazing and trampling by livestock, weed invasion and the activities of feral pigs.
