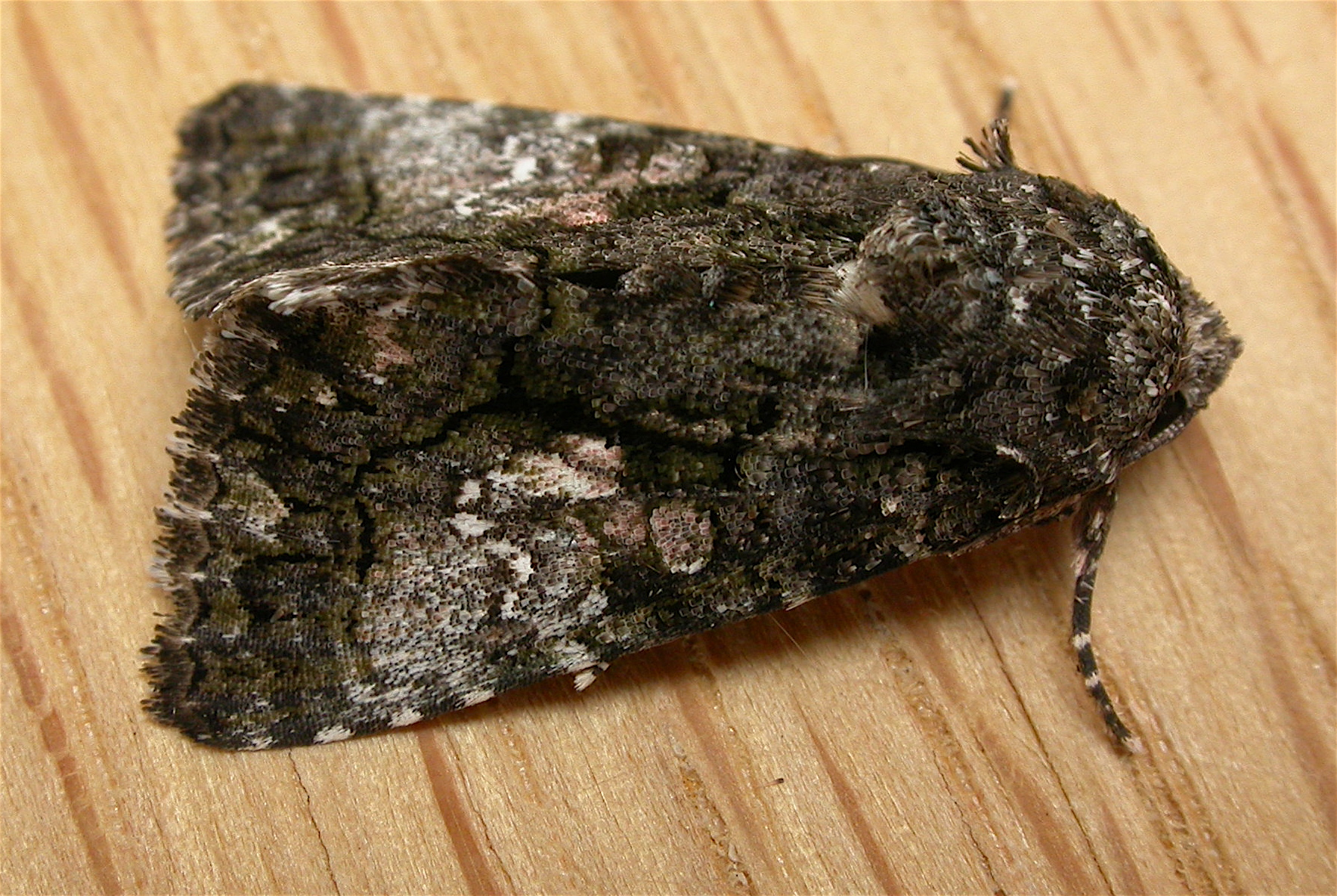

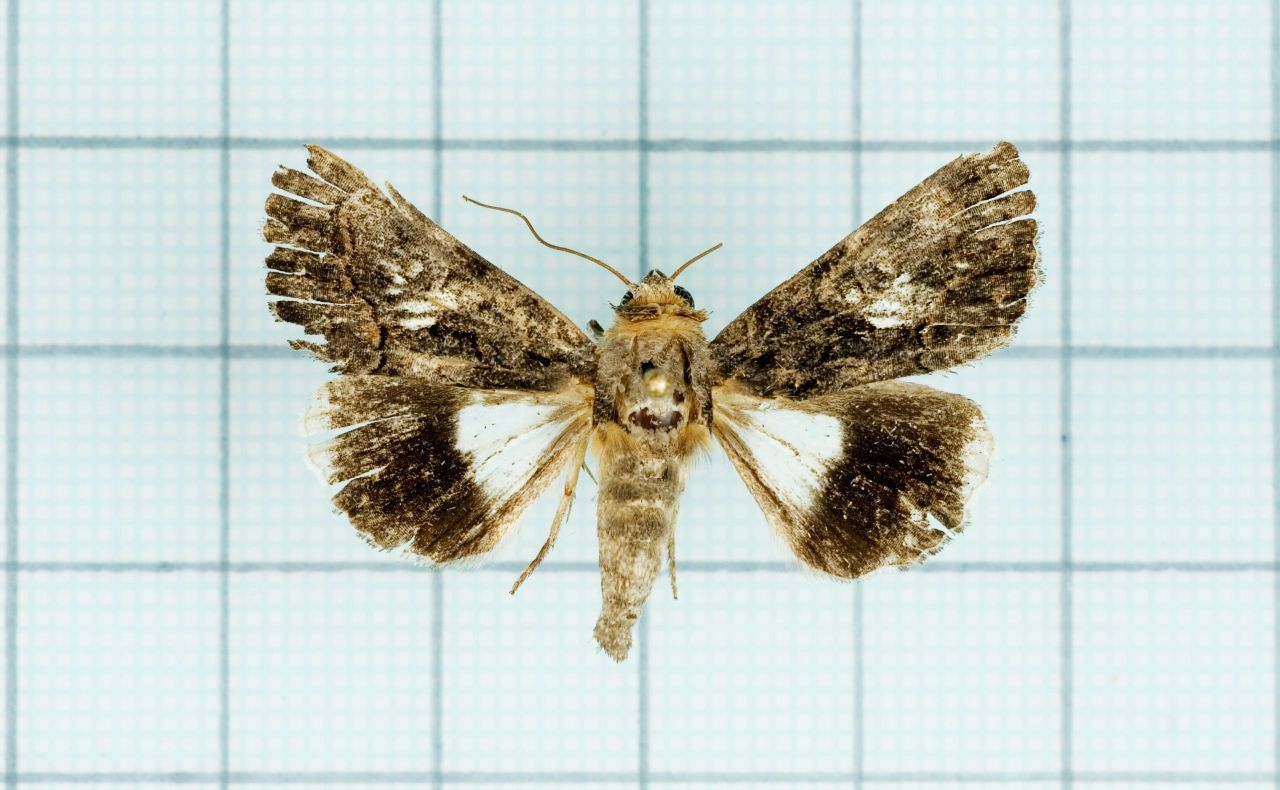

Scientific classification
- Kingdom: Animalia
- Phylum: Arthropoda
- Class: Insecta
- Order: Lepidoptera
- Superfamily: Noctuoidea
- Family: Erebidae
- Genus: Aedia
- Species: A. leucomelas

Binomial name
- Aedia leucomelas (Linnaeus, 1758)

Synonyms
- Phalaena leucomelas Linnaeus, 1758; Anophia acronyctoides Guenée, 1852; Noctua adepta Geyer, 1832; Anophia albodiscalis Roepke, 1932; Anophia limitaris Walker, 1863; Anophia olivescens Guenée, 1852; Anophia thomae Prout, 1927; Catephia ramburii Boisduval, 1829

= Aedia leucomelas =

Sorcerer

Species of moth

Aedia leucomelas, the eastern alchymist, sweet potato leaf worm or sorcerer, is a moth of the family Noctuidae. It is found in large parts of the world, ranging from Europe all over Asia up to Japan and some African countries. The subspecies Aedia leucomelas acronyctoides is found in Australia.

== Description ==
The wingspan is about 38 millimetres (1.5 in). Antennae of male almost simple. Forelegs of male lack scaly tufts and long fringes. Body fuscous. Thorax and forewings suffused with olive or white. Forewings with indistinct sub-basal and waved antemedial lines. There are traces of orbicular, reniform, and claviform spots. A postmedial double waved line slightly excurved beyond cell. Traces of an irregular sub-marginal lines present, along with a marginal black specks series. Hindwings pure white, where the inner margin fuscous suffused. Outer half of wings black with white patches at apex and anal angle. Ventral side of forewings with basal two thirds white, with spot at end of cell.

The moth flies from June to September depending on the location. The larvae mainly feed on Convolvulus species, including C. sepium, C. erubescens and C. arvensis, but also on Ipomoea pes-caprae, Ipomoea batatas and perhaps Chondrilla juncea.

== Gallery ==
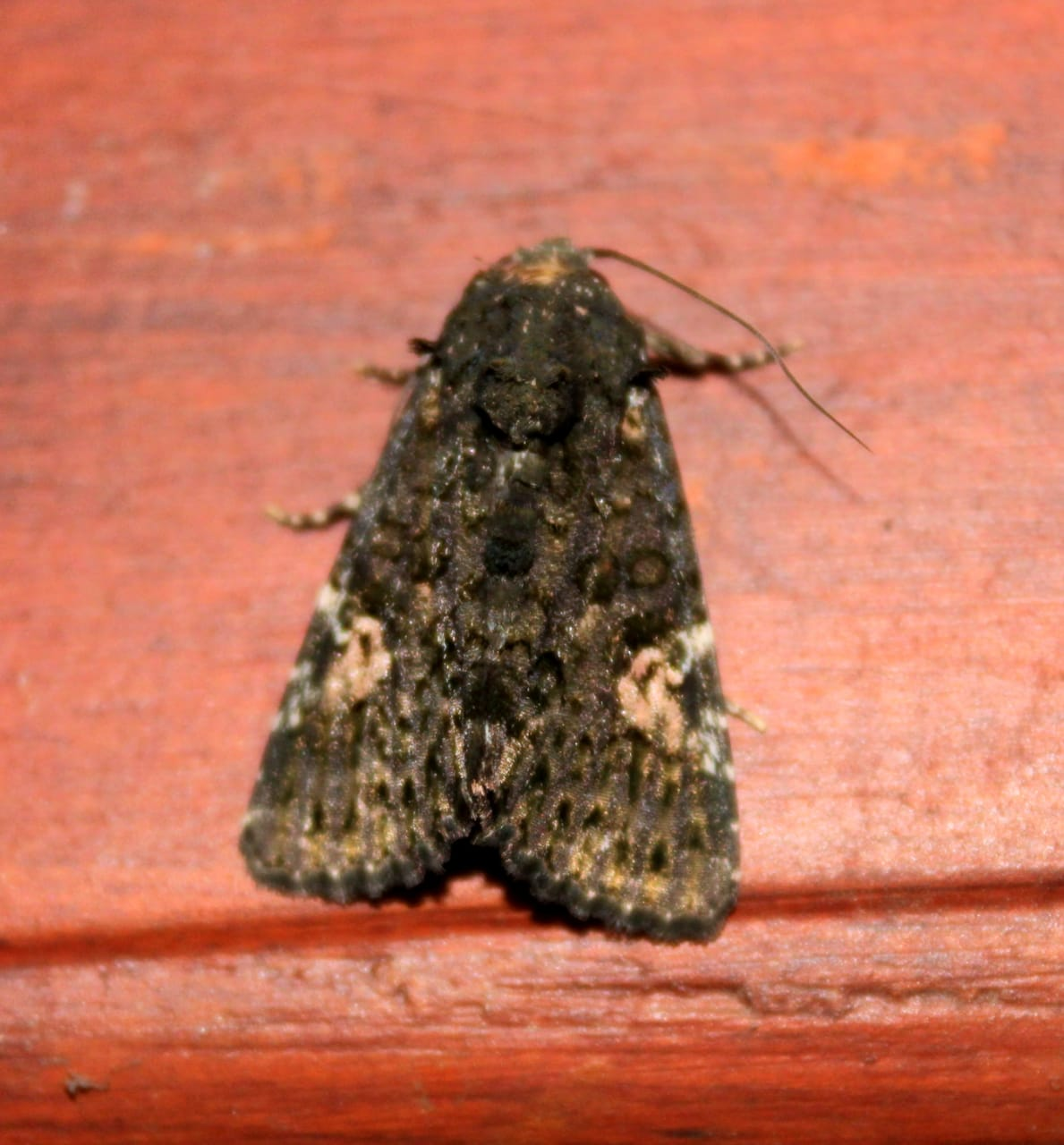
