= Aedia melas =

Scientific classification
- Domain: Eukaryota
- Kingdom: Animalia
- Phylum: Arthropoda
- Class: Insecta
- Order: Lepidoptera
- Superfamily: Noctuoidea
- Family: Erebidae
- Genus: Aedia
- Species: A. melas

Binomial name
- Aedia melas Bethune-Baker, 1906

Synonyms
- Catephia melas

Species of moth

Aedia melas is a species of moth of the family Noctuidae. It is found on New Guinea.

The wingspan is about 37 mm. The forewings are dark reddish brown, with a waved antemedial line, beyond which the medial area is very dark. The postmedial line is almost crenulate, beyond this line the costal area is pale reddish brown. The apex is darkish brown and the subterminal line is pale red-brown and there is a whitish spot just above the tornus. The reniform spot is greyish. The hindwings are black with a white central patch.
