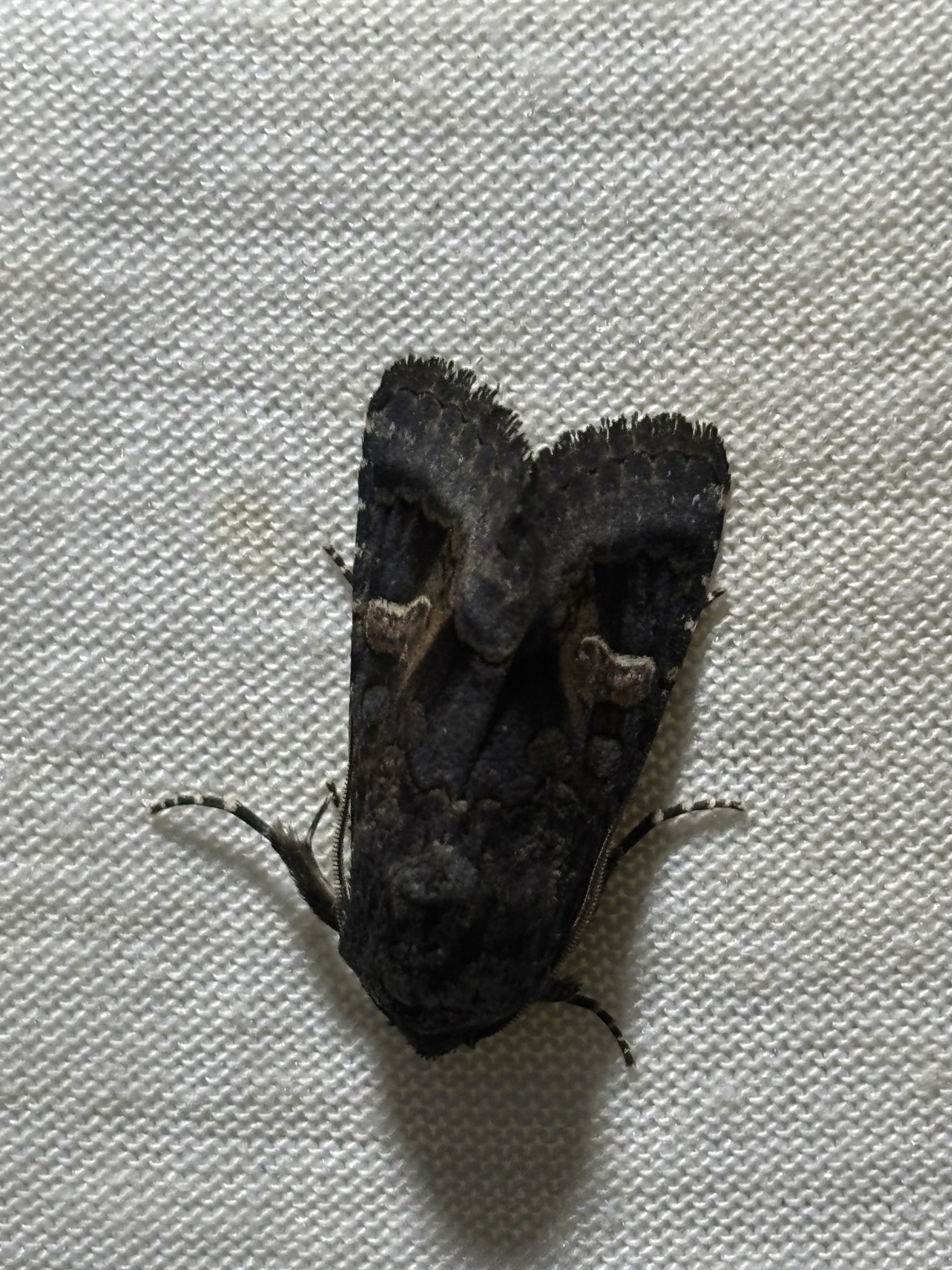

Scientific classification
- Kingdom: Animalia
- Phylum: Arthropoda
- Clade: Pancrustacea
- Class: Insecta
- Order: Lepidoptera
- Superfamily: Noctuoidea
- Family: Erebidae
- Genus: Aedia
- Species: A. nigrescens

Binomial name
- Aedia nigrescens (Wallengren, 1856)

Synonyms
- Anophia nigrescens Wallengren, 1856; Melanephia nigrescens (Wallengren, 1856)

= Aedia nigrescens =

Species of moth

Aedia nigrescens is a moth of the family Noctuidae first described by Wallengren in 1856 in the genus Anophia. It was originally found in the Southern Africa, later Central and West Africa.

== Taxonomy ==
The name Aedia nigrescens (Wallengren, 1856) is a recombination, it is a homonym of Aedia nigrescens Grote & Robinson, 1866 which became a subjective synonym of Melipotis indomita (Walker, 1858)
