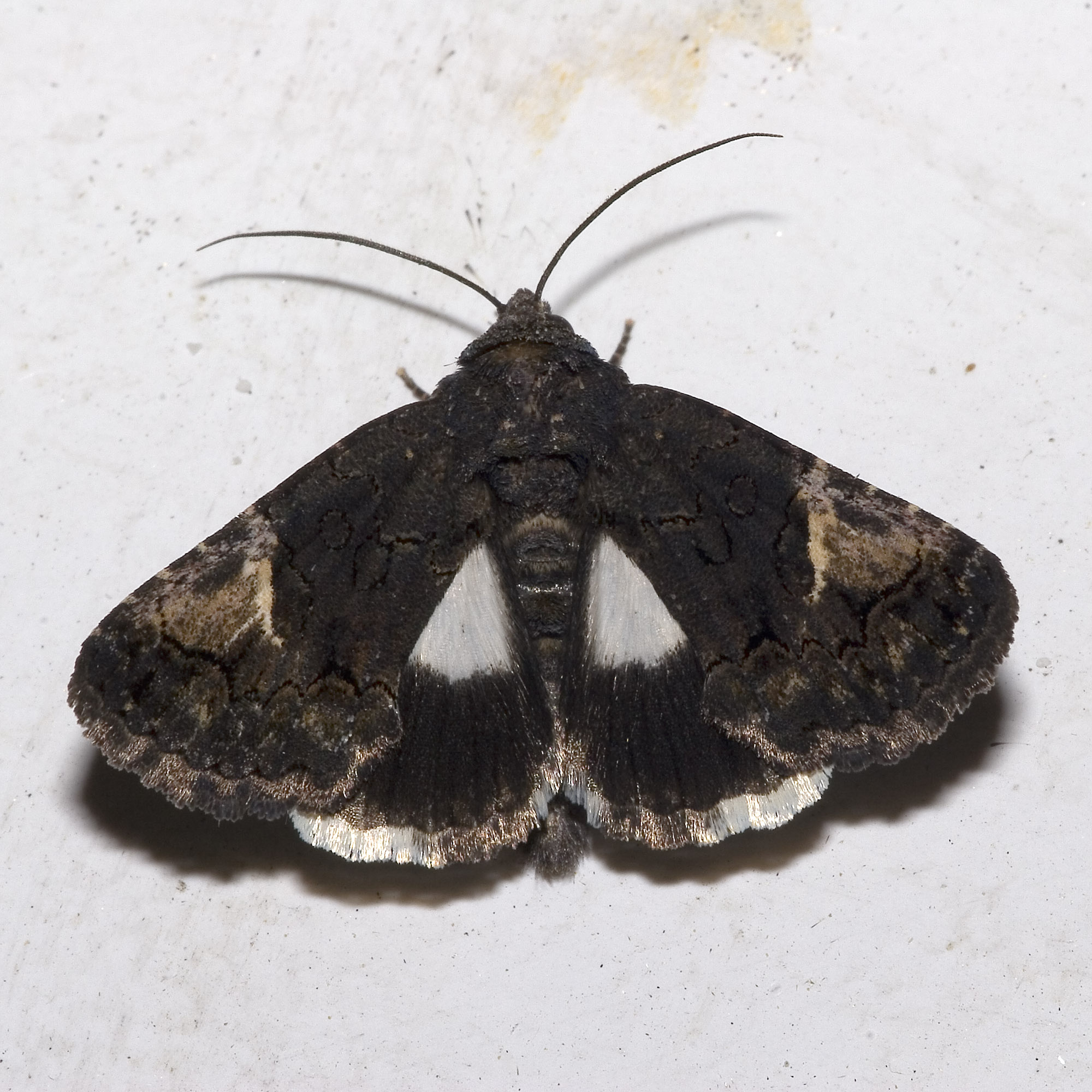

Scientific classification
- Domain: Eukaryota
- Kingdom: Animalia
- Phylum: Arthropoda
- Class: Insecta
- Order: Lepidoptera
- Superfamily: Noctuoidea
- Family: Erebidae
- Genus: Aedia
- Species: A. funesta

Binomial name
- Aedia funesta (Esper, [1786])

Synonyms
- Noctua funesta Esper, 1786

= Aedia funesta =

Species of moth

Aedia funesta or the druid is a moth of the family Erebidae. It is found in Central Europe, Southern Europe, Anatolia and Iran.

There are two generations per year. Adults are on wing from April to June and from August to October.

The larvae feed on Calystegia sepium and Convolvulus arvensis.
