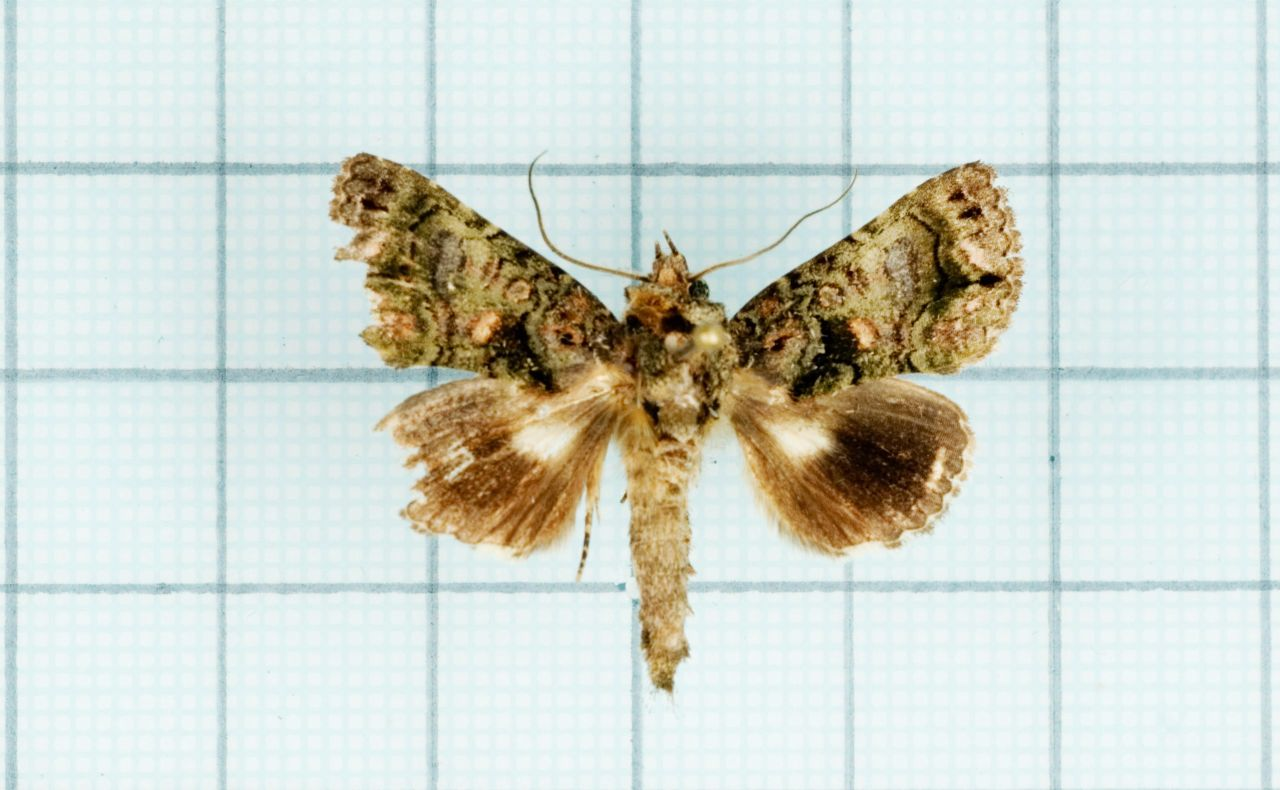

Scientific classification
- Kingdom: Animalia
- Phylum: Arthropoda
- Clade: Pancrustacea
- Class: Insecta
- Order: Lepidoptera
- Superfamily: Noctuoidea
- Family: Erebidae
- Genus: Aedia
- Species: A. perdicipennis

Binomial name
- Aedia perdicipennis (Moore, 1882)

Synonyms
- Anophia perdicipennis Moore, 1882; Catephia perdicipennis

= Aedia perdicipennis =

Species of moth

Aedia perdicipennis is a moth of the family Noctuidae first described by Frederic Moore in 1882. It is found in the north-eastern Himalayas of India, Nepal, Thailand, Myanmar, Taiwan, Singapore, Borneo, Sumatra and Sulawesi.
