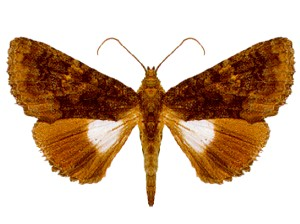
- Aedia leucomelas
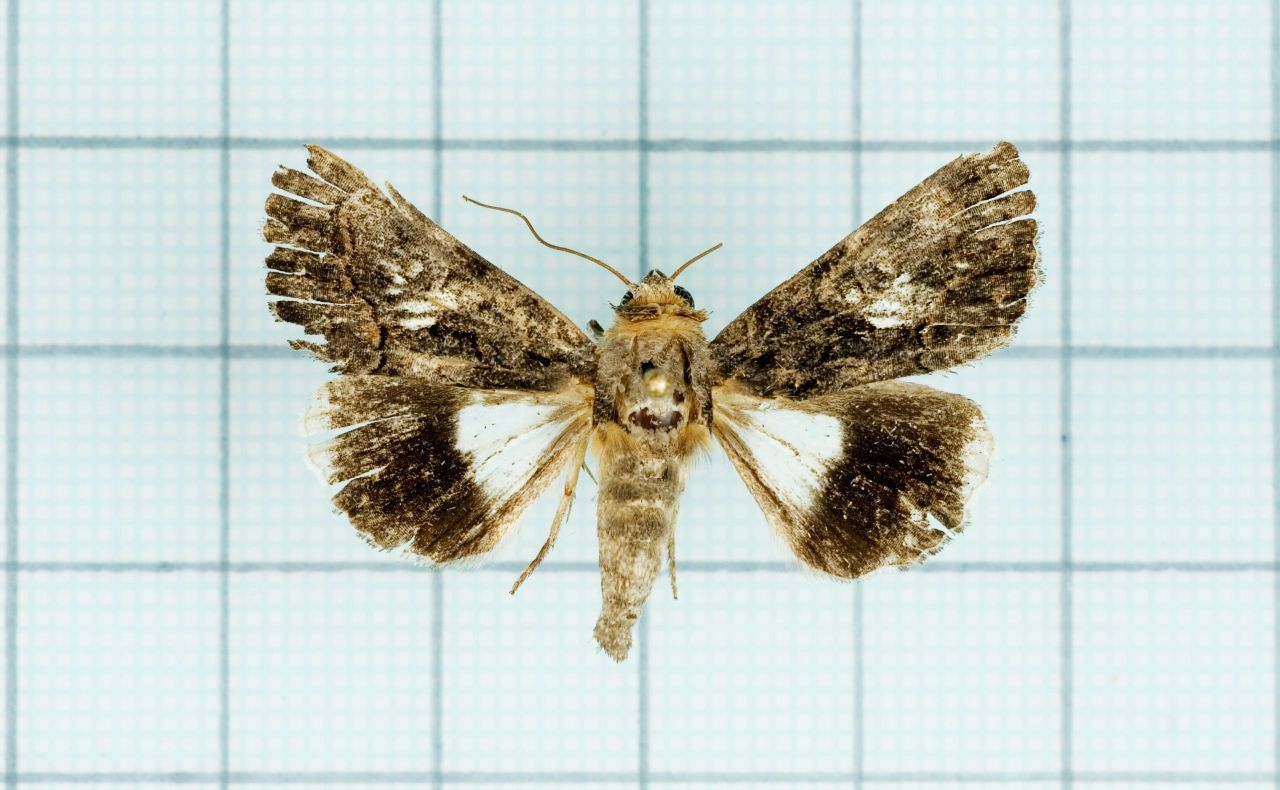

Scientific classification
- Kingdom: Animalia
- Phylum: Arthropoda
- Clade: Pancrustacea
- Class: Insecta
- Order: Lepidoptera
- Superfamily: Noctuoidea
- Family: Erebidae
- Subfamily: Erebinae
- Genus: Aedia; Hübner, [1823]

Synonyms
- Anophia Guenée, 1841; Ecpatia Turner, 1902; Eopaectes Hulstaert, 1924; Eucatephia Hampson, 1926; Dysedia Rogenhofer, 1874; Herchunda Swinhoe, 1900; Premusia Walker; Idicara Walker, [1863]; Syagrana Wiltshire, 1980; Renatia Berio, 1985

= Aedia =

Genus of moths

Aedia is a genus of noctuid moths erected by Jacob Hübner in 1823. If it is placed in Catocalinae, it is assigned to its own subtribe, Aediina and if placed in Acontiinae, it is assigned to its own tribe Aediini.

== Species ==
- Aedia albomacula (Hulstaert, 1924)
- Aedia arctipennis (Hulstaert, 1924)
- Aedia banian (Viette, 1965)
- Aedia dinawa (Bethune-Baker, 1906)
- Aedia dulcistriga (Walker, 1858)
- Aedia funesta (Esper, 1786)
- Aedia hollina (Dognin 1897)
- Aedia kumamotonis (Matsumura 1926)
- Aedia leucomelas (Linnaeus, 1758)
- Aedia melas Bethune-Baker, 1906
- Aedia nigrescens (Wallengren, 1856)
- Aedia olivescens (Guenée, 1852)
- Aedia perdicipennis (Moore, 1882)
- Aedia pruna Semper 1900
- Aedia sericea Butler, 1882
