= Aedia banian =

Scientific classification
- Kingdom: Animalia
- Phylum: Arthropoda
- Class: Insecta
- Order: Lepidoptera
- Superfamily: Noctuoidea
- Family: Erebidae
- Genus: Aedia
- Species: A. banian

Binomial name
- Aedia banian (Viette, 1965)

Synonyms
- Melanephia banian Viette, 1965

Species of moth

Aedia banian is a species of moth of the family Erebidae. It was described by Pierre Viette in 1965 and is found in south western Madagascar. Its type was provided from Ankazoabo in Atsimo-Andrefana.

This species has a wingspan of 30–37 mm. The forewings are greyish, marbled blackish.

== See also ==
- List of moths of Madagascar
