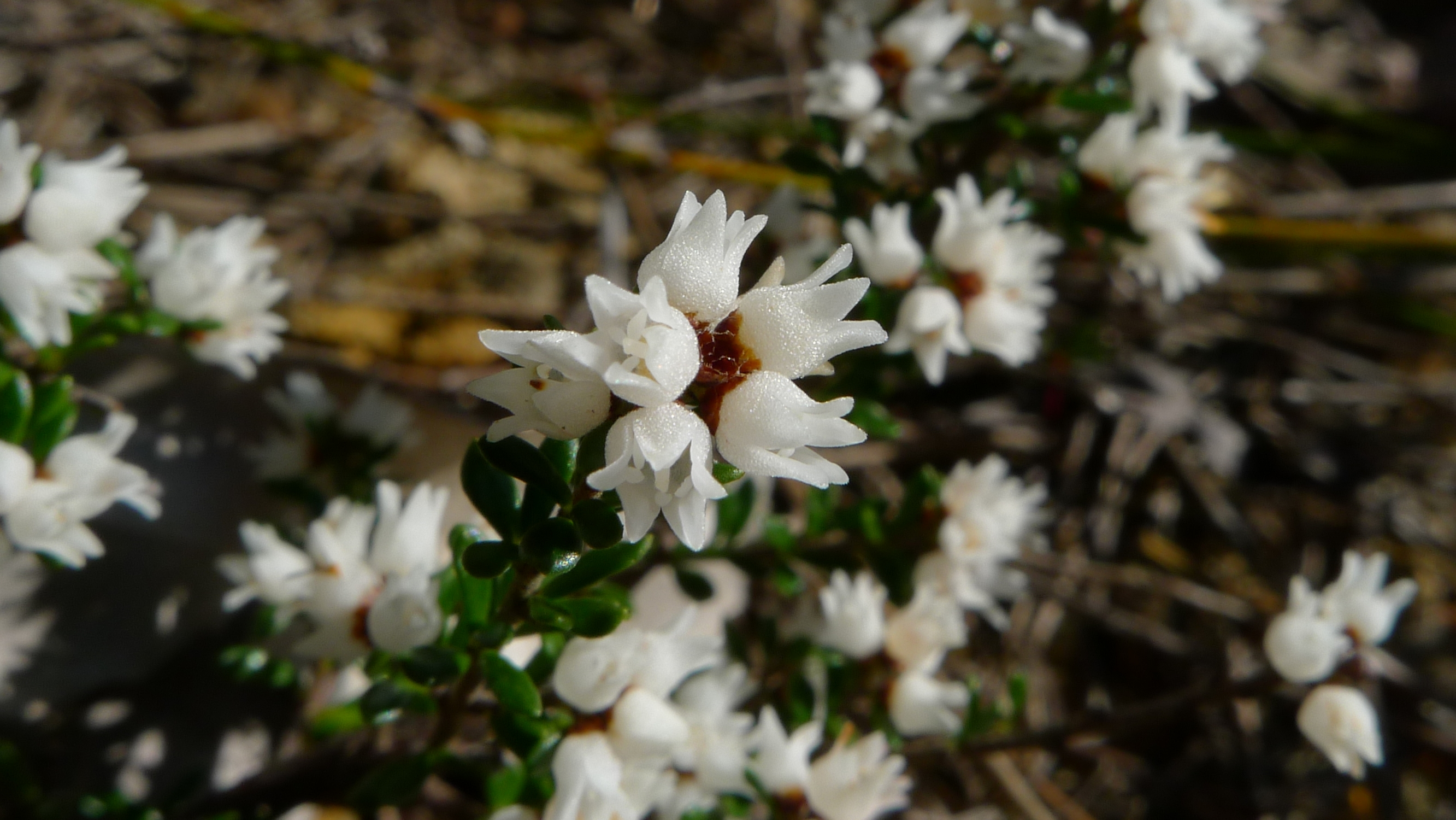
- In the Royal National Park

Scientific classification
- Kingdom: Plantae
- Clade: Tracheophytes
- Clade: Angiosperms
- Clade: Eudicots
- Clade: Rosids
- Order: Rosales
- Family: Rhamnaceae
- Genus: Cryptandra
- Species: C. amara

Binomial name
- Cryptandra amara Sm.

Synonyms
- Cryptandra amara Sm. var. amara; Cryptandra amara var. longiflora F.Muell. ex Maiden & Betche; Cryptandra ericaefolia Sieber ex Fenzl nom. inval., pro syn.; Cryptandra largiflora F.Muell. ex Reissek; Cryptandra nervata Reissek; Cryptandra sieberi Fenzl; Cryptandra sieberi var. angustifolia Fenzl; Cryptandra sieberi var. latifolia Fenzl; Cryptandra sieberi Fenzl var. sieberi

= Cryptandra amara =

Species of flowering plant

Cryptandra amara, commonly known as bitter cryptandra or pretty pearlflower, is a species of flowering plant in the family Rhamnaceae and is endemic to eastern Australia. It is a densely branched shrub with clustered, more or less linear to egg-shaped or elliptic leaves, and tube-shaped white flowers arranged on the ends of branchlets.

== Description ==
Cryptandra amara is a small woody shrub that typically grows to a height of up to 1 m (3 ft 3 in). It is often extensively branched, the branchlets tending to be rigid, sometimes spiny, and covered in fine, star-shaped hairs. The leaves are more or less linear to oblong or egg-shaped, sometimes with the narrower end towards the base, 2–5 mm (0.079–0.197 in) long and 1–2 mm (0.039–0.079 in) wide and often clustered at the ends of branchlets. The flowers are white, tube-shaped or bell-shaped, and arranged at the ends of branchlets, sometimes singly or in small groups, sometimes in spike-like clusters of many flowers. The bracts are brown, broadly elliptic and up to 1.5 mm (0.059 in) long. The sepals are about the same length as the floral tube, the petals about 0.5 mm (0.020 in) long. Flowering mainly occurs from August to October and the fruit of Cryptandra amara is a capsule that divides into single-seeded fruitlets. The seeds are reddish-brown in colour, with a short aril.

== Taxonomy ==
Cryptandra amara was first formally described in 1808 by James Edward Smith in The Cyclopaedia from specimens collected by "Dr. White". The specific epithet (amara) means "bitter".

== Distribution and habitat ==
Cryptandra amara grows on shallow, often rocky soils, in grassland, shrubland, woodland and heathy forest in eastern Australia. It is found in south-east Queensland, through most of New South Wales, in central, northern and eastern Victoria and southern South Australia. In Tasmania it mainly occurs in the Southern Midlands with scattered population in other places.

== Conservation status ==
Pretty pearlflower is listed as "endangered" under the Tasmanian Government Threatened Species Protection Act 1995.
