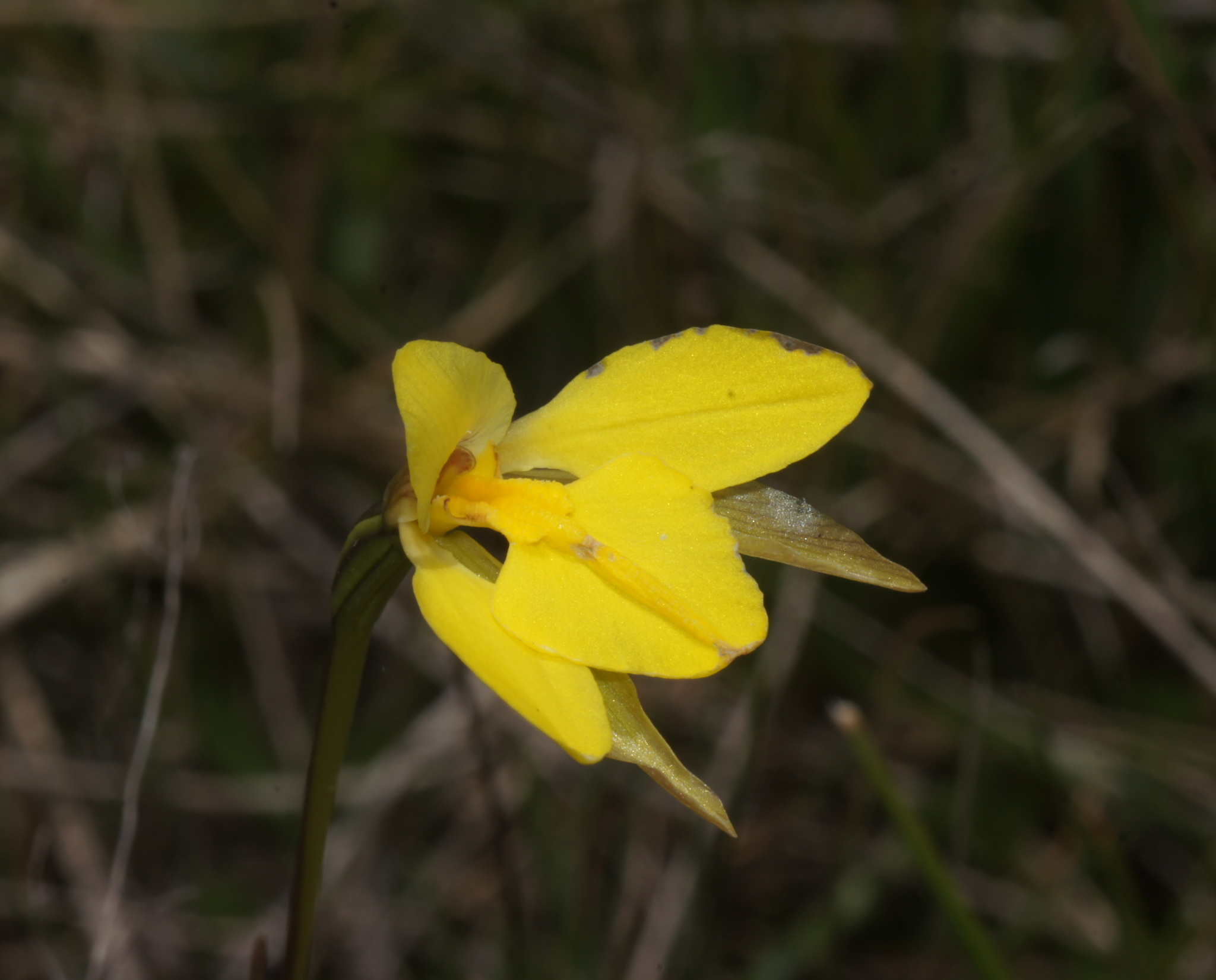
- Near the Dargo River

Scientific classification
- Kingdom: Plantae
- Clade: Embryophytes
- Clade: Tracheophytes
- Clade: Angiosperms
- Clade: Monocots
- Order: Asparagales
- Family: Orchidaceae
- Subfamily: Orchidoideae
- Tribe: Diurideae
- Genus: Diuris
- Species: D. subalpina

Binomial name
- Diuris subalpina D.L.Jones

= Diuris subalpina =

Slender golden moths

Species of orchid

Diuris subalpina, commonly known as slender golden moths is a species of orchid that is endemic to south-eastern continental Australia. It has two linear leaves and up to three bright yellow flowers with fine, reddish streaks.

== Description ==
Diuris subalpina is a tuberous, perennial herb with two linear leaves 50–150 mm (2.0–5.9 in) long. Up to three, almost drooping, bright yellow flowers with very faint red streaks are borne on a flowering stem 60–180 mm (2.4–7.1 in) tall. The dorsal sepal is egg-shaped, 7–10 mm (0.28–0.39 in) long and relatively small with reddish-brown streaks at the base, and an upturned tip. The lateral sepals are linear to lance-shaped, 15–20 mm (0.59–0.79 in) long and usually parallel to each other. The petals are drooping, narrowly egg-shaped to elliptic, 11–17 mm (0.43–0.67 in) long and usually underneath the labellum. The labellum is 14–16 mm (0.55–0.63 in) long and has three lobes, the side lobes tiny and horn-like with a reddish base and the mid-lobe six times longer than the side lobes. There are two softly-hairy longitudinal ridges near the base of the labellum and a faint ridge extending almost to the tip of the labellum. Flowering occurs from October to December.

== Taxonomy ==
Diuris subalpina was first formally described in 2008 by David Jones in "The Orchadian" from a specimen collected in Namadgi National Park in 1996. The specific epithet (subalpina) means "less than high altitude", referring to the montane and subalpine habitat of this orchid.

== Distribution and habitat ==
Slender golden moths are abundant in montane and subalpine areas of south-eastern New South Wales, the Australian Capital Territory and north-eastern Victoria.
