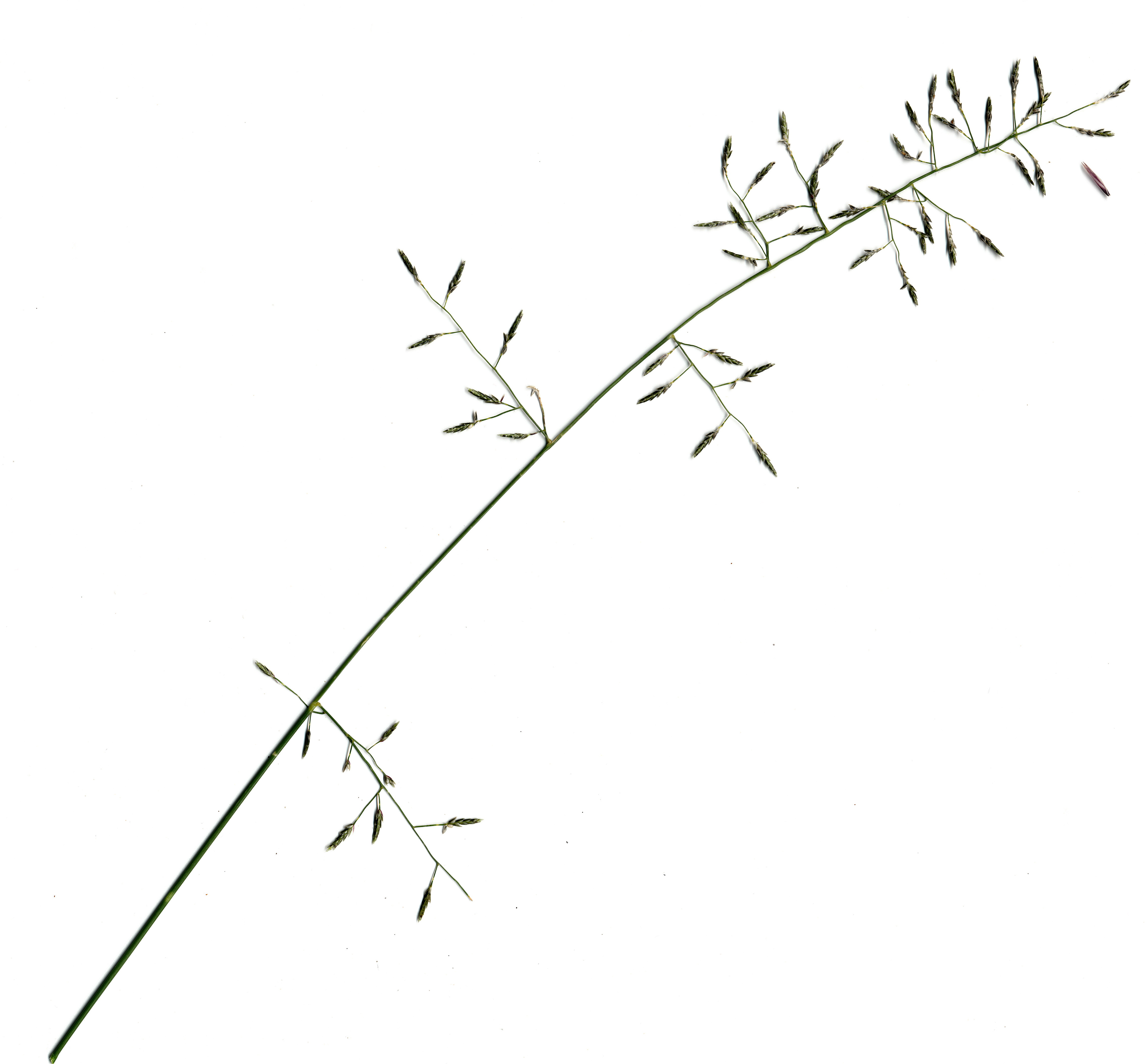

Scientific classification
- Kingdom: Plantae
- Clade: Tracheophytes
- Clade: Angiosperms
- Clade: Monocots
- Clade: Commelinids
- Order: Poales
- Family: Poaceae
- Subfamily: Chloridoideae
- Genus: Eragrostis
- Species: E. leptostachya

Binomial name
- Eragrostis leptostachya (R.Br.) Steud.

Synonyms
- Poa leptostachya R.Br.

= Eragrostis leptostachya =

Paddock lovegrass

Species of grass

Eragrostis leptostachya is a species of grass known as the paddock lovegrass. Found in eastern Australia, it may be seen growing in eucalyptus woodland or pasture. The grass may grow up to 1 m (3 ft 3 in) tall. As Poa leptostachya, it was one of the many plants first published by Robert Brown with the type known as "(J.) v.v." Appearing in his Prodromus Florae Novae Hollandiae et Insulae Van Diemen in 1810.
