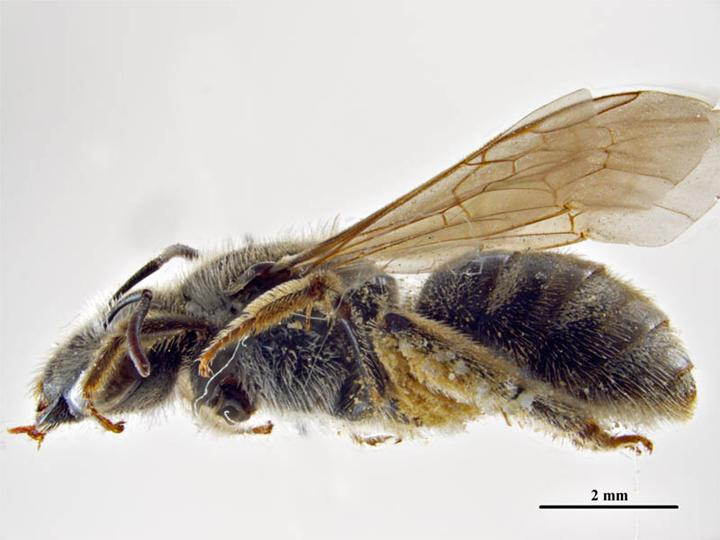
- Female

Scientific classification
- Kingdom: Animalia
- Phylum: Arthropoda
- Clade: Pancrustacea
- Class: Insecta
- Order: Hymenoptera
- Family: Halictidae
- Genus: Lasioglossum
- Species: L. lanarium

Binomial name
- Lasioglossum lanarium Smith, 1853

Synonyms
- Halictus lanarius Smith, 1853; Halictus lanuginosus Smith, 1879; Halictus mitchelli Cockerell, 1906

= Lasioglossum lanarium =

Species of bee

Lasioglossum lanarium, or Lasioglossum (Chilalictus) lanarium, is a species of bee in the family Halictidae and subfamily Halictinae. It is endemic to Australia. It was described by English entomologist Frederick Smith in 1853.

== Distribution and habitat ==
The species occurs across much of southern Australia. Type localities include the Hunter River in New South Wales and Hobart, Tasmania.

== Behaviour ==
The adults are flying mellivores. Flowering plants visited by the bees include Allocasuarina, Arctotheca, Asphodelus, Atalaya, Bursaria, Cakile, Calendula, Calytrix, Carpobrotus, Cassia, Chrysanthemum, Convolvulus, Coreopsis, Dahlia, Daviesia, Dichopogon, Dillwynia, Diplotaxis, Diuris, Echinops, Eucalyptus, Goodenia, Grevillea, Helichrysum, Helipterum, Hibbertia, Hypochaeris, Lavatera, Leptospermum, Medicago, Melaleuca, Microseris, Myoporum, Orthrosanthus, Oxalis, Pachylepis, Papaver, Persicaria, Persoonia, Pultenaea, Ranunculus, Rapistrum, Rubus, Scabiosa, Scaevola, Schinus, Senecio, Taraxacum, Thelymitra, Thymus, Veronica, Wahlenbergia, Westringia and Xanthorrhoea species.

On Leptorhynchos sp. in the Latrobe Valley

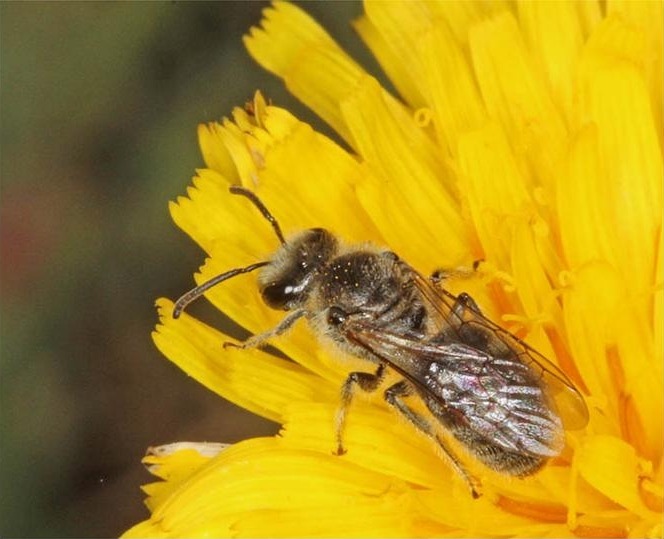
Male

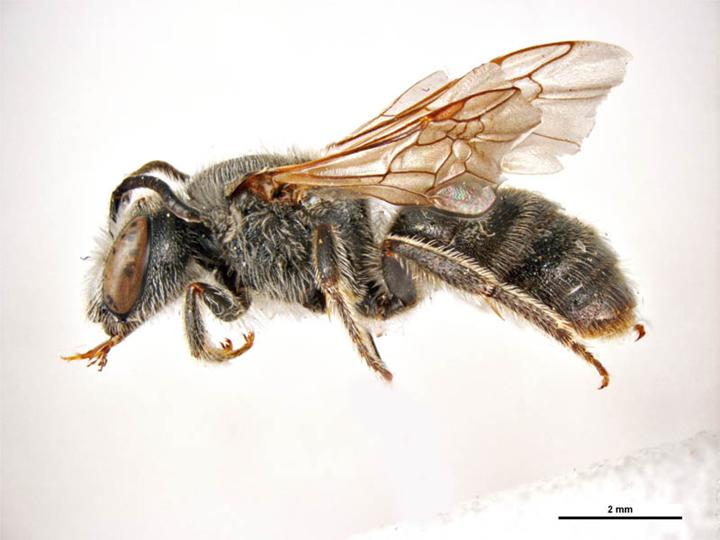
Male
