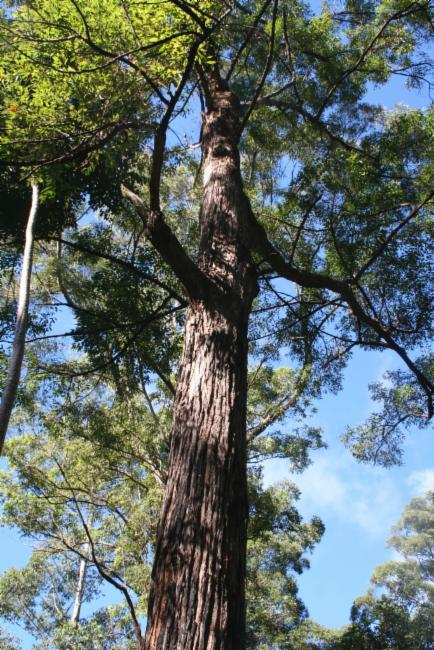
- Eucalyptus siderophloia at Mount Mellum

Conservation status
- Near Threatened (IUCN 3.1)

Scientific classification
- Kingdom: Plantae
- Clade: Tracheophytes
- Clade: Angiosperms
- Clade: Eudicots
- Clade: Rosids
- Order: Myrtales
- Family: Myrtaceae
- Genus: Eucalyptus
- Species: E. siderophloia

Binomial name
- Eucalyptus siderophloia Benth.

= Eucalyptus siderophloia =

Northern grey ironbark

Species of eucalyptus

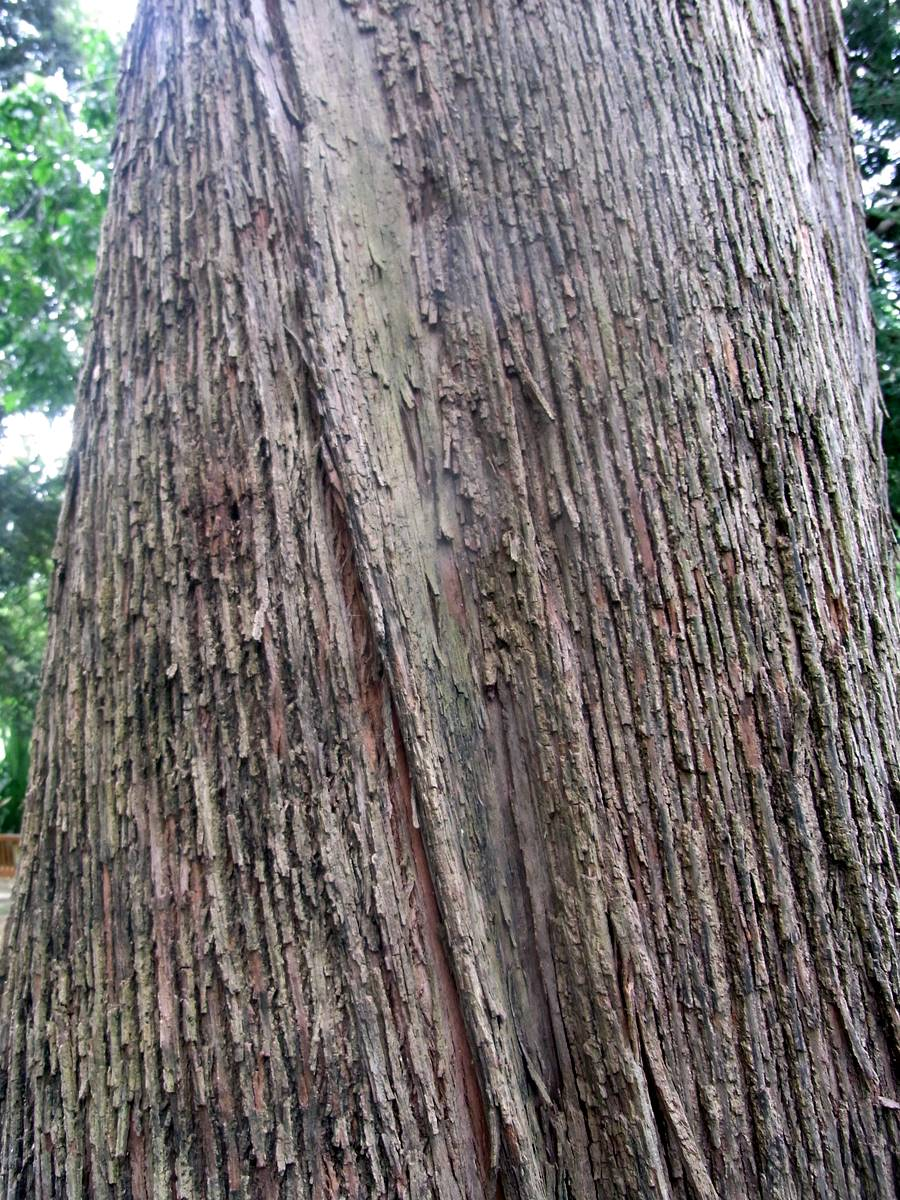
Bark

Eucalyptus siderophloia, commonly known as the northern grey ironbark, is a medium-sized to tall ironbark tree that is endemic to eastern Australia. It has hard, dark, furrowed bark, lance-shaped to curved adult leaves, flower buds in groups of seven, white flowers and cup-shaped or conical fruit.

== Description ==
Eucalyptus siderophloia is a tree that typically grows to a height of 20–45 m (66–148 ft) and forms a lignotuber. It has hard, rough, furrowed grey or black bark on the trunk and branches, sometimes smooth on the thinner branches. Young plants and coppice regrowth have egg-shaped to lance-shaped leaves that are paler on the lower surface, 50–120 mm (2.0–4.7 in) long and 15–48 mm (0.59–1.89 in) wide. Adult leaves are the same shade of green on both sides, lance-shaped to curved, 85–175 mm (3.3–6.9 in) long and 15–30 mm (0.59–1.18 in) wide, tapering to a petiole 10–25 mm (0.39–0.98 in) long. The flowers are mostly arranged on the ends of branchlets in groups of seven on a branched peduncle 5–12 mm (0.20–0.47 in) long, the individual buds on pedicels 2–8 mm (0.079–0.315 in) long. Mature buds are diamond-shaped or spindle-shaped, 5–10 mm (0.20–0.39 in) long and 3–4 mm (0.12–0.16 in) wide with a conical operculum. Flowering mainly occurs from September to January and the flowers are white. The fruit is a woody cup-shaped or conical capsule 3–8 mm (0.12–0.31 in) long and 4–7 mm (0.16–0.28 in) wide with the valves near rim level.

== Taxonomy and naming ==
Eucalyptus siderophloia was first formally described in 1867 by George Bentham in Flora Australiensis. Terri-barri is an Aboriginal word from the Sydney region. The specific epithet (siderophloia) is derived from Greek words meaning "iron" and "bark".

== Distribution and habitat ==
This ironbark grows in forests on the coast and adjacent foothills in soils of reasonable fertility, from about Maryborough and Springsure in Queensland to near Sydney in New South Wales.

== Uses ==
The sapwood is usually resistant to the lyctus borer. Not an easy timber to work, however it has a beautiful appearance similar to some rainforest species. Uses include flooring and decking, shipbuilding, poles, construction, railway sleepers and heavy engineering.
