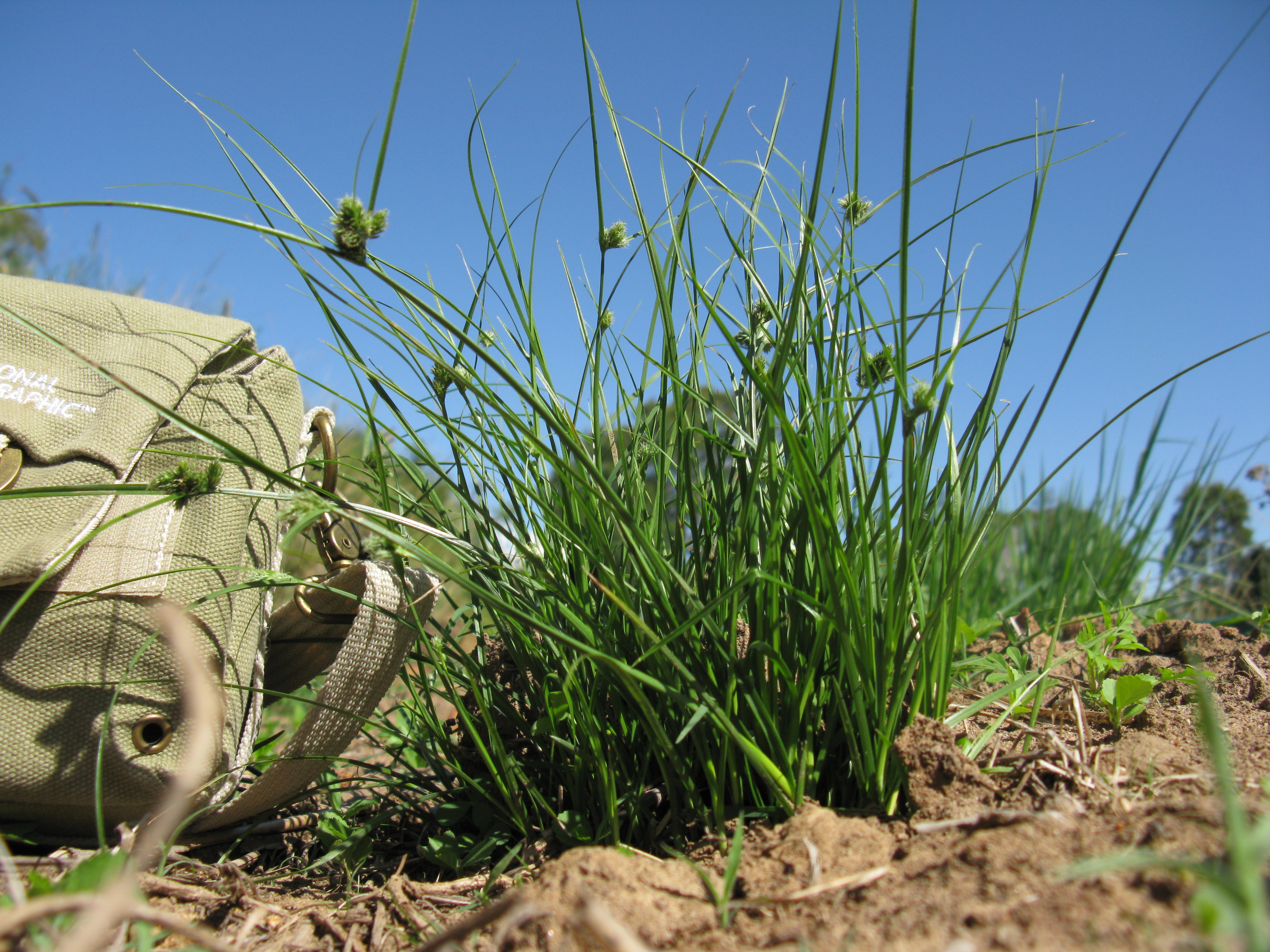

Scientific classification
- Kingdom: Plantae
- Clade: Tracheophytes
- Clade: Angiosperms
- Clade: Monocots
- Clade: Commelinids
- Order: Poales
- Family: Cyperaceae
- Genus: Carex
- Species: C. inversa

Binomial name
- Carex inversa R.Br., 1810

= Carex inversa =

Knob sedge

Species of grass-like plant

Carex inversa, commonly known as knob sedge, is a species of sedge of the family Cyperaceae that is native to parts of Australia and New Zealand and has also been introduced into Great Britain.

== Description ==
The monoecious and rhizomatous perennial grass-like sedge has a tufted habit and typically grows to a height of 0.3 to 0.75 metres (1 to 2 ft). It blooms between September and October producing brown flowers. The plant has a reasonably long rhizome with shoots that are loosely tufted. The smooth and erect culms have a circular cross-section and are usually 10 to 50 cm (3.9 to 19.7 in) in length. The length of the leaves is usually less than that of the culms and have a blade with a width of 0.7 to 2 mm (0.028 to 0.079 in) and are surrounded by dark brown coloured sheaths.

== Taxonomy ==
The species was described by Robert Brown in 1810 as a part of the work Prodromus Florae Novae Hollandiae et Insulae Van Diemen from specimens collected from his time in Australia between 1801 and 1806. There are ten synonyms for this species including; Carex inversa var. leichardtii, Carex inversa var. major, Carex inversa var. minor, Carex rhytidocarpa and Vignea inversa.

== Distribution ==
It is native to parts of Australia, and is often found in winter wet depressions and along creek and rivers throughout a large area through the Wheatbelt, Peel, South West and Great Southern regions of Western Australia where it grows in sandy-clay-loam soils. It is also found in south eastern parts of South Australia and southern and eastern parts of Australia extending north into coastal areas of New South Wales and Queensland. The grass also occurs on Norfolk Island. The plant is also commonly found in New Zealand and is regarded as non endemic.

== See also ==
- List of Carex species
