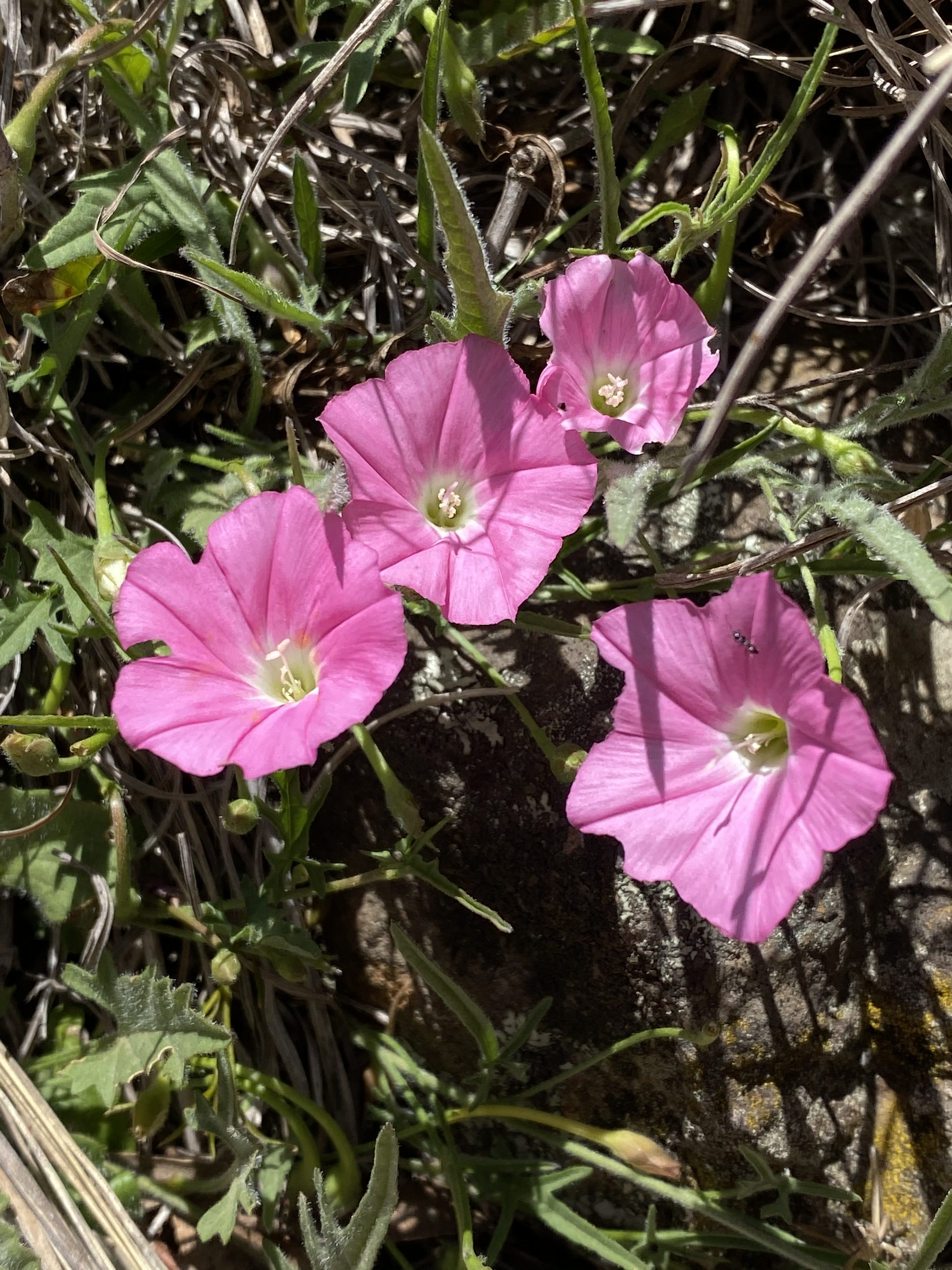
- Convolvulus erubescens near Taralga

Scientific classification
- Kingdom: Plantae
- Clade: Tracheophytes
- Clade: Angiosperms
- Clade: Eudicots
- Clade: Asterids
- Order: Solanales
- Family: Convolvulaceae
- Genus: Convolvulus
- Species: C. erubescens

Binomial name
- Convolvulus erubescens Sims

= Convolvulus erubescens =

Blushing bindweed

Species of plant

Convolvulus erubescens, commonly known as blushing bindweed, or Australian bindweed, is a perennial herbaceous plant in the family Convolvulaceae that is endemic to Australia.

== Description ==
Convolvulus erubescens has trailing and twining stems and variable leaves, ovate to triangular or arrow-shaped, 25–55 mm long and 2–40 mm wide and may have numerous or occasional hairs. The leaves may end with a small distinct point, rounded or sometimes a broad shallow notch. The leaf edges are smooth at the base becoming lobed or toothed toward the apex with ascending, flattened hairs. The mid-green leaves are on a stalk up to 25 mm (0.98 in) long. The inflorescence consists of 1-3 rosy-pink, white or mauve funnel-shaped flowers, 7–15 mm long, 8–20 mm in diameter, with a pale, greenish throat. The cluster of flowers are usually on needle-shaped stalks 10–60 mm (0.39–2.36 in) long covered with soft flattened hairs. Flowering occurs mainly in late spring and early autumn but may flower throughout the year in some locations. The seed capsules are roughly spherical in shape 4.5–6 mm (0.18–0.24 in) long and 5.5–6.5 mm (0.22–0.26 in) in diameter and with a smooth surface.

== Taxonomy and naming ==
Convolvulus erubescens was first formally described in 1807 by John Sims and the description was published in Botanical Magazine. The specific epithet (erubescens) is derived from the Latin meaning "reddening" or "blushing" possibly referring to the flowers.

== Distribution and habitat ==
Blushing bindweed is found in coastal and subcoastal areas where it inhabits eucalypt forests, the margins of rainforests, grassy woodlands and grasslands. Found growing in all states, and the Northern Territory of Australia.
