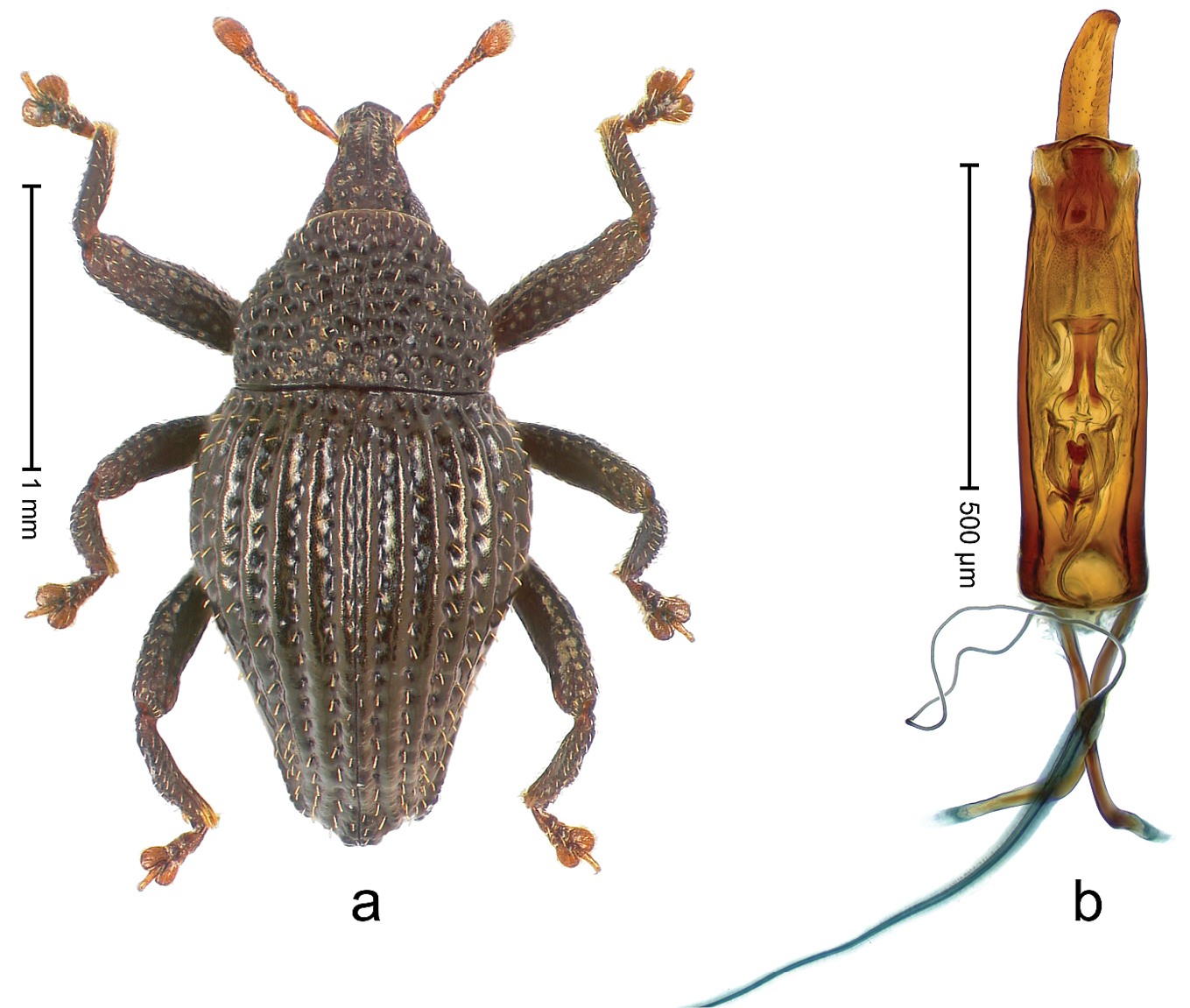

Scientific classification
- Kingdom: Animalia
- Phylum: Arthropoda
- Clade: Pancrustacea
- Class: Insecta
- Order: Coleoptera
- Suborder: Polyphaga
- Infraorder: Cucujiformia
- Superfamily: Curculionoidea
- Family: Curculionidae
- Genus: Trigonopterus
- Species: T. costipennis

Binomial name
- Trigonopterus costipennis Riedel, 2014

= Trigonopterus costipennis =

Species of beetle

Trigonopterus costipennis is a species of flightless weevil in the genus Trigonopterus from Indonesia. The species was described in 2014 and is named after the shape of its elytra. The beetle is 2.04–2.51 mm long. It has a black body with ferruginous tarsi and antennae. Endemic to East Java, where it is known from Mount Semeru and Mount Wilis at elevations of 1,345–1,572 m (4,410–5,160 ft).

== Taxonomy ==
Trigonopterus costipennis was described by the entomologist Alexander Riedel in 2014 on the basis of an adult male specimen collected from Mount Semeru on the island of Java in Indonesia. The specific name is derived from the Latin words costa, meaning "rib" or "ridge", and penna, meaning "elytron", referring to the shape of the species' elytra.

== Description ==
The beetle is 2.04–2.51 mm long. It has a black body with ferruginous tarsi and antennae. The body is elongate and subovate, with a distinct constriction between the pronotum and elytra visible both dorsally and in profile. The rostrum features a median ridge and a pair of submedian ridges, with a scabrous texture just behind the epistome. Sparse rows of suberect setae are present along the furrows. The epistome bears a transverse, angular ridge. The pronotum shows a subapical constriction and has a coarsely punctate, scabrous surface. Each puncture contains a suberect, weakly club-shaped scale inserted at the posterior rim.

The elytra have striae marked by deep punctures, each preceded by a piliform, erect scale. The intervals are costate, nearly glabrous, and weakly microreticulate. Both the sutural interval and interval 7 are swollen near the apex and project slightly beyond the body outline. The femora are edentate (without teeth), and the metafemur lacks a subapical stridulatory patch. The dorsal edges of the meso- and metatibiae are denticulate. Abdominal ventrite 5 is flat, microreticulate, nearly nude, and bears only a few short setae.

The penis has an asymmetrical apex, with the tip slightly upcurved and extended to the left. The apical extension is long, and the basal orifice is ventrally simple. The apodemes are short, measuring half the length of the penis body. The ductus ejaculatorius contains a bulbus.

In females, the rostrum is nearly glabrous on the dorsal apical half and densely punctate. The epistome is simple, and the elytral apex in females is unmodified.

== Distribution ==
Trigonopterus costipennis is endemic to the Indonesian province of East Java, where it is known from Mount Semeru and Mount Wilis. It has been recorded at elevations of 1,345–1,572 m (4,410–5,160 ft).
