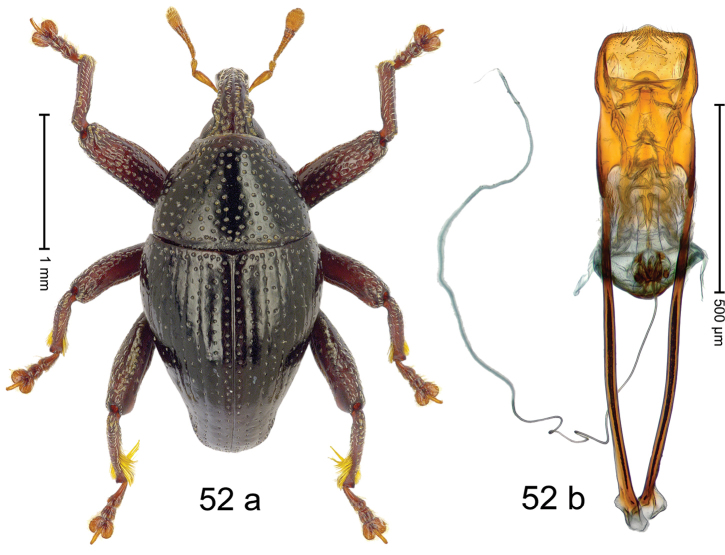
- Holotype; a habitus b penis

Scientific classification
- Kingdom: Animalia
- Phylum: Arthropoda
- Clade: Pancrustacea
- Class: Insecta
- Order: Coleoptera
- Suborder: Polyphaga
- Infraorder: Cucujiformia
- Family: Curculionidae
- Genus: Trigonopterus
- Species: T. moatensis

Binomial name
- Trigonopterus moatensis Riedel, 2019

= Trigonopterus moatensis =

Species of beetle

Trigonopterus moatensis is a species of flightless weevil in the genus Trigonopterus endemic to Sulawesi, Indonesia. It was described in 2019.
