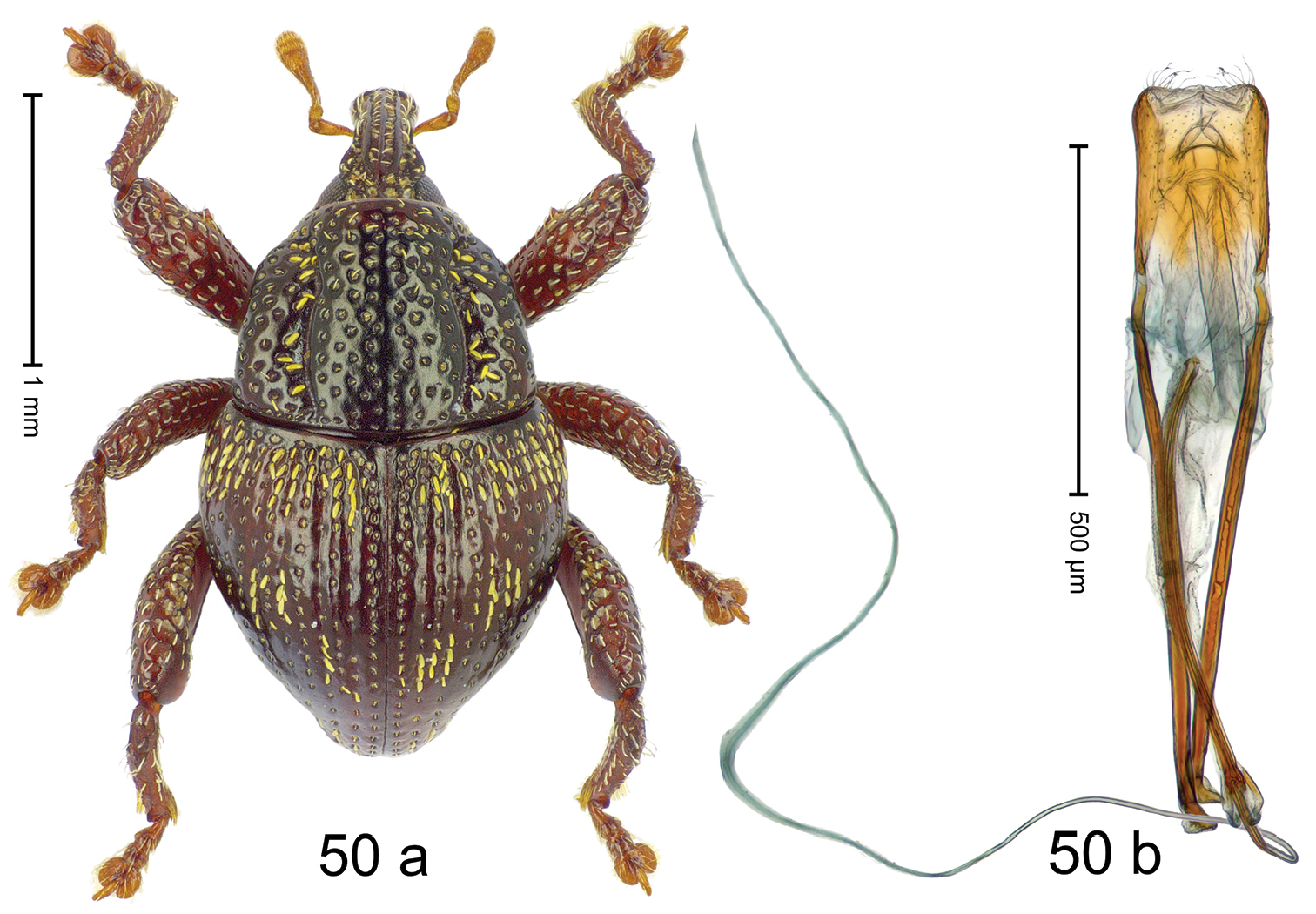

Scientific classification
- Kingdom: Animalia
- Phylum: Arthropoda
- Clade: Pancrustacea
- Class: Insecta
- Order: Coleoptera
- Suborder: Polyphaga
- Infraorder: Cucujiformia
- Family: Curculionidae
- Genus: Trigonopterus
- Species: T. mesai

Binomial name
- Trigonopterus mesai Riedel, 2019

= Trigonopterus mesai =

Species of beetle

Trigonopterus mesai is a beetle in the family Curculionidae, native to Indonesia. The species was described in May 2019. The beetle is 1.92–2.20 mm long. It has reddish-brown antennae, legs, and elytra, while the rest of the body is black. The weevil is endemic to Central Sulawesi, where it is found in the leaf litter of montane forests at elevations of 700–760 m.

== Taxonomy ==
Trigonopterus mesai was described by the entomologist Alexander Riedel in 2019 on the basis of an adult male specimen collected from Mount Taluanjang in Central Sulawesi, Indonesia. The species is named after Raden Pramesa Narakusumo (nicknamed Mesa), the curator for beetles at the Indonesian National Zoological Collection.

== Description ==
The beetle is 1.92–2.20 mm long. The beetle has reddish-brown antennae and legs and darker elytra. The rest of the body is black. Its body is somewhat oval in shape, with a moderate narrowing between the pronotum and elytra when viewed from above, and it appears convex in profile. The rostrum has a central ridge and two submedian ridges, with the grooves between them sparsely covered in upright scales. The epistome is short and features a transverse ridge at the back.

The pronotum has gently converging sides with a slight narrowing near the front. Its surface includes two distinct longitudinal grooves lined with scattered yellow, almond-shaped scales. The central area is broadly raised and densely covered with coarse punctures, with a narrow, nearly smooth line running down the middle. The elytra are densely and irregularly punctured, with striae 1 to 3 faintly marked. Sparse yellow flat scales are present, especially in the basal third and near the middle.

The femora are toothed, each ending in a sharp point. The underside ridges of the middle and hind femora are crenate. The hind femur also has a toothed upper rear edge and a stridulatory patch near the tip. The rear edge of the tibiae has small teeth near the base, and the hind tibia is slightly curved. The first two abdominal segments are slightly sunken and mostly smooth, with a few coarse punctures. The fifth segment is slightly concave in the middle, with scattered coarse punctures and a few upright hairs.

In the male genitalia, the penis has nearly parallel sides and a blunt tip, with sparse hairs. The apodemes are 3.4 times the length of the penis body. The internal transfer structure is flagelliform and three times longer than the penis. The ductus ejaculatorius has a faintly defined bulb at its base.

== Distribution ==
Found in leaf litter of montane forests in South Sulawesi at elevations of 700–760 m.
