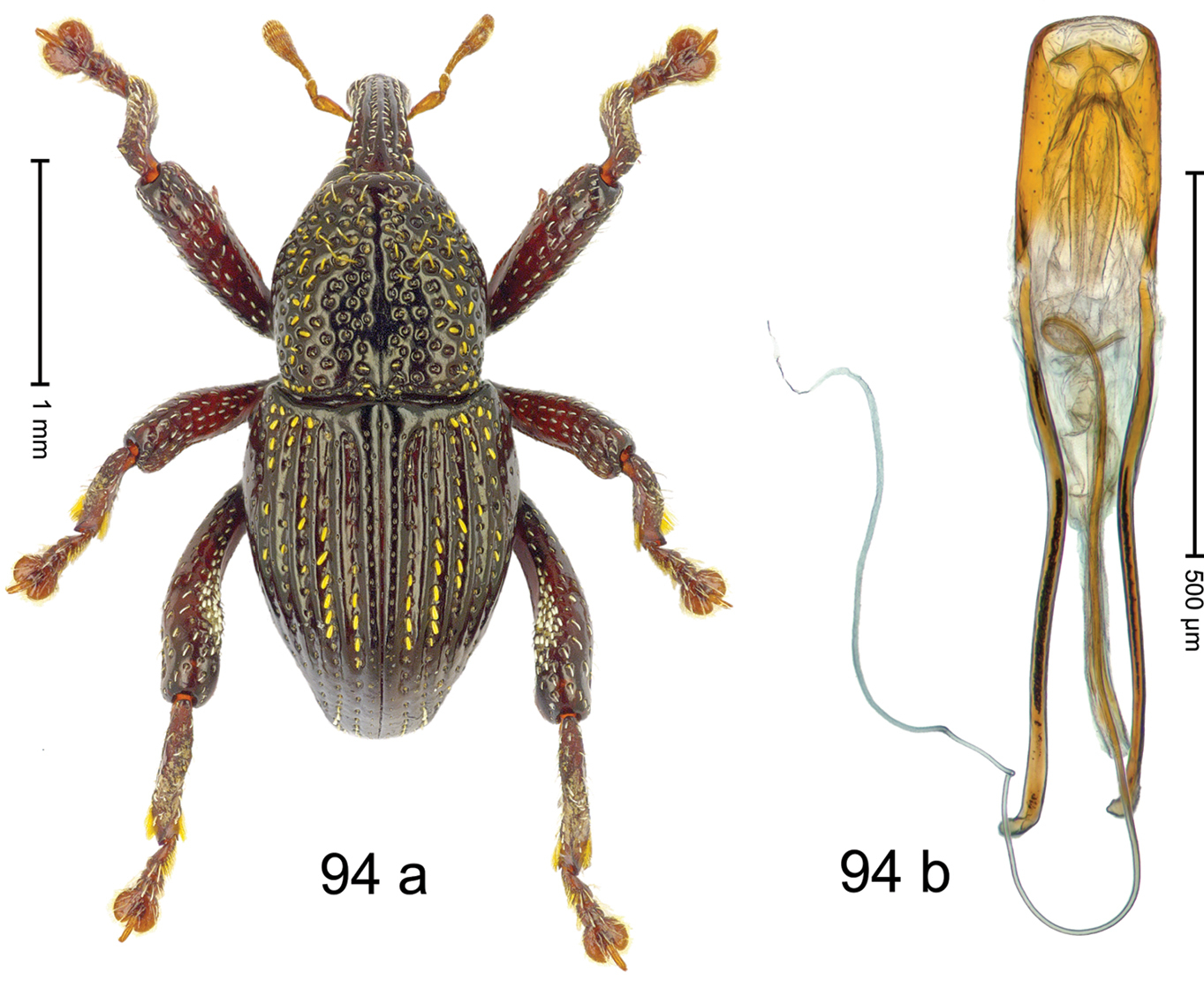

Scientific classification
- Kingdom: Animalia
- Phylum: Arthropoda
- Clade: Pancrustacea
- Class: Insecta
- Order: Coleoptera
- Suborder: Polyphaga
- Infraorder: Cucujiformia
- Family: Curculionidae
- Genus: Trigonopterus
- Species: T. suturatus

Binomial name
- Trigonopterus suturatus Riedel, 2019

= Trigonopterus suturatus =

Species of Weevil

Trigonopterus suturatus is a species of flightless weevil in the genus Trigonopterus from Indonesia.

== Description ==
The species is endemic to Sulawesi in Indonesia. The species was described in May 2019.Riedel, Alexander; Narakusumo, Raden Pramesa (2019-03-07). "One hundred and three new species of Trigonopterus weevils from Sulawesi". ZooKeys (828): 1–153. Bibcode:2019ZooK..828....1R. doi:10.3897/zookeys.828.32200. ISSN 1313-2989. PMC 6418079. PMID 30940991.
