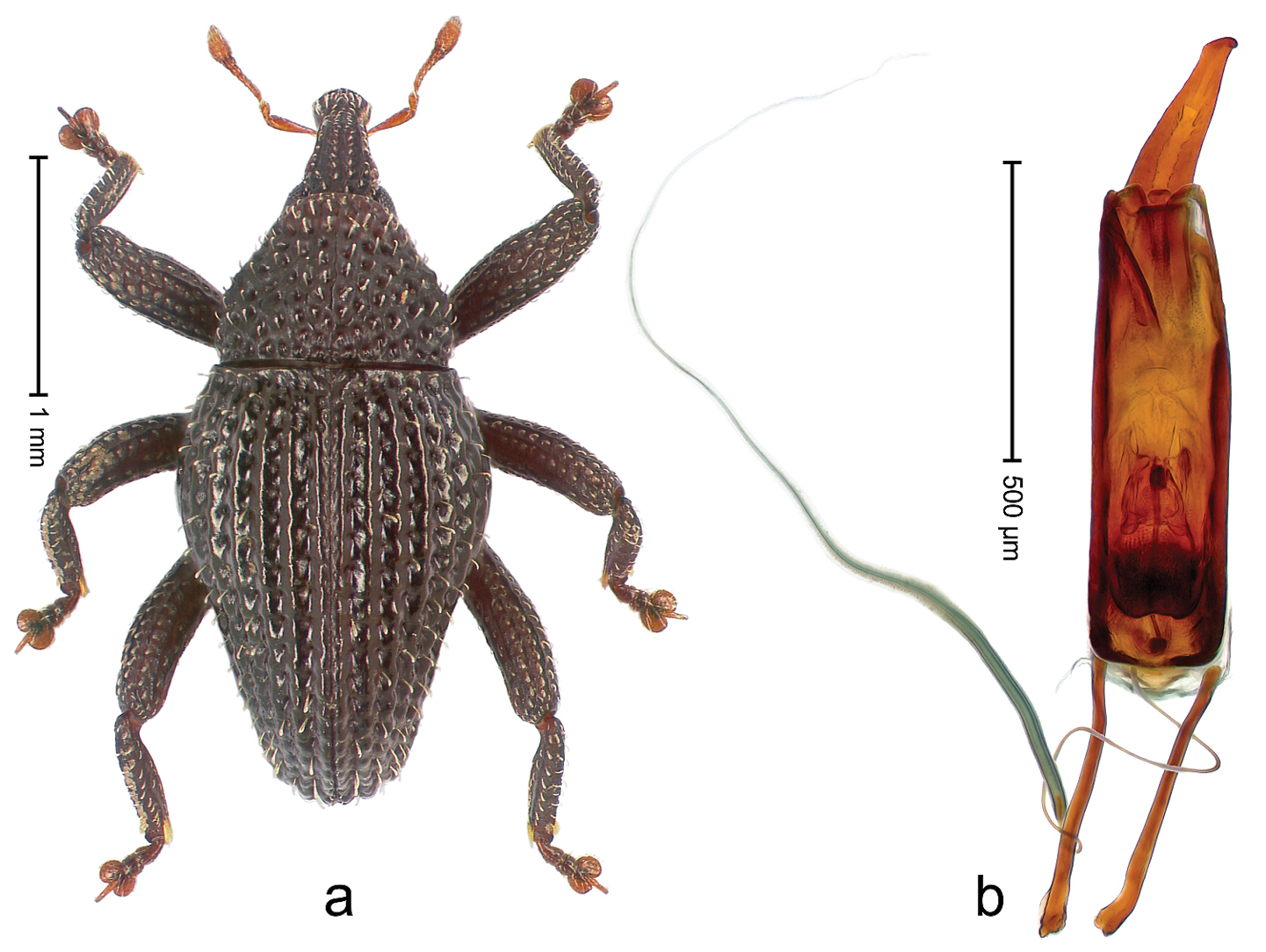
- Holotype specimen and penis

Scientific classification
- Kingdom: Animalia
- Phylum: Arthropoda
- Clade: Pancrustacea
- Class: Insecta
- Order: Coleoptera
- Suborder: Polyphaga
- Infraorder: Cucujiformia
- Family: Curculionidae
- Genus: Trigonopterus
- Species: T. misellus

Binomial name
- Trigonopterus misellus Riedel, 2014

= Trigonopterus misellus =

Species of beetle

Trigonopterus misellus is a species of flightless weevil in the genus Trigonopterus from Indonesia.

== Etymology ==
The specific name is derived from the Latin word misellus, meaning "poor".

== Description ==
Individuals measure 2.30–2.65 mm in length. Body is slightly oval in shape. General coloration is black, with rust-colored tarsi and antennae.

== Range ==
The species is found around elevations of 579–744 metres (1,900–2,441 ft) around Pedada Bay in the Indonesian province of Lampung.

== Phylogeny ==
T. misellus is part of the subgenus Mimidotasia.
