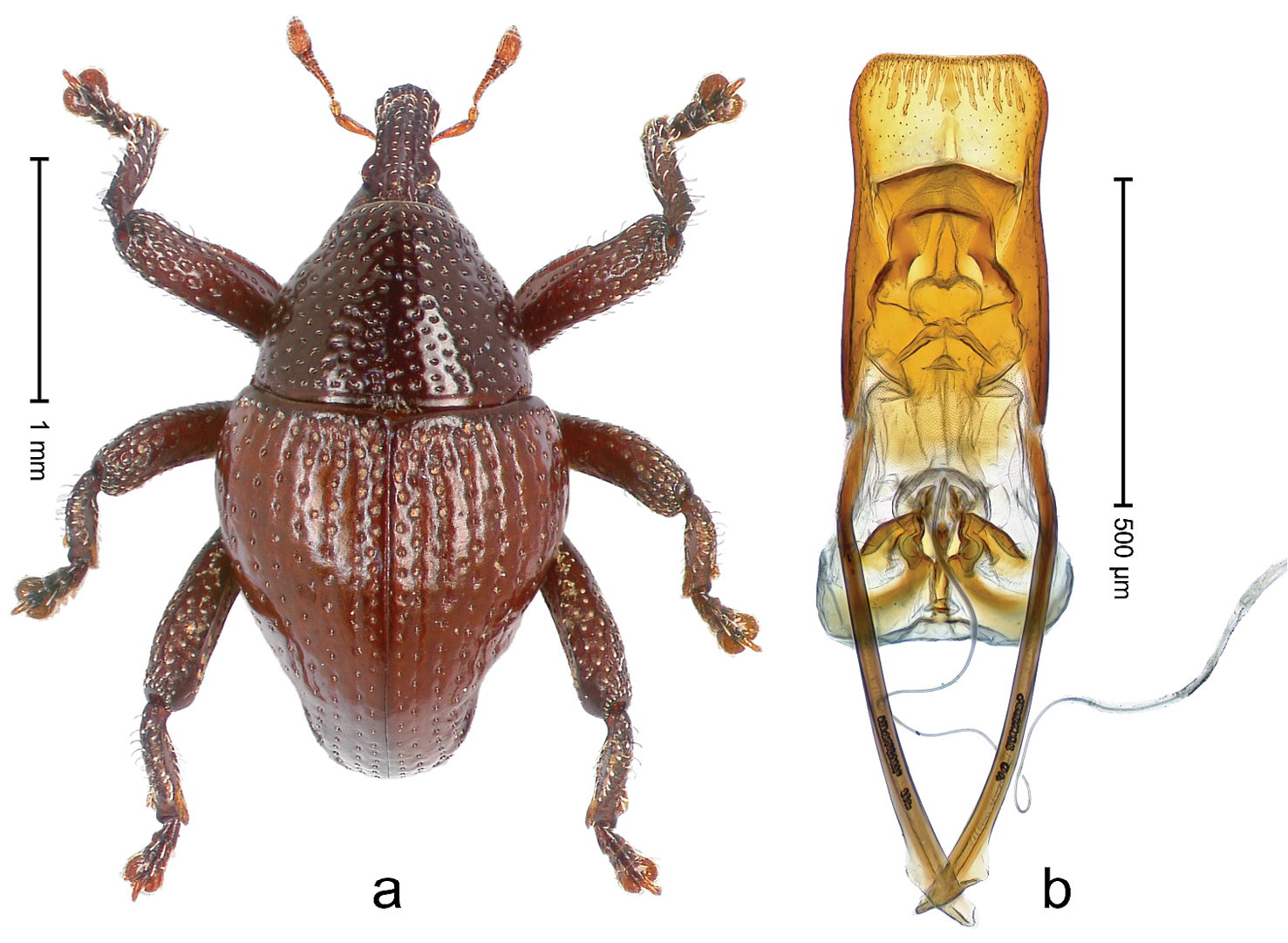

Scientific classification
- Kingdom: Animalia
- Phylum: Arthropoda
- Class: Insecta
- Order: Coleoptera
- Suborder: Polyphaga
- Infraorder: Cucujiformia
- Family: Curculionidae
- Genus: Trigonopterus
- Species: T. bawangensis

Binomial name
- Trigonopterus bawangensis Riedel, 2014

= Trigonopterus bawangensis =

Species of beetle

Trigonopterus bawangensis is a species of flightless weevil in the genus Trigonopterus from Indonesia. The species was described in 2014. The beetle is 1.90–2.48 mm long. It is mostly ferruginous, with a dark ferruginous to black pronotum. Endemic to Borneo, where it is known only from Mount Bawang at elevations of 246–556 m (810–1,820 ft).

== Taxonomy ==
Trigonopterus bawangensis was described by the entomologist Alexander Riedel in 2014 on the basis of an adult male specimen collected from Mount Bawang on the island of Borneo in Indonesia. The species is named its type locality.

== Description ==
The beetle is 1.90–2.48 mm long. The body is mostly ferruginous, with a dark ferruginous to black pronotum. The body is subrhomboid in dorsal view, showing a slight constriction between the pronotum and elytra, and is dorsally convex in profile. The rostrum features a central ridge and a pair of indistinct submedian ridges, with a coarse punctate-reticulate texture and sparse rows of suberect scales. Just in front of the forehead, the median ridge is swollen and projects subangularly in profile. The epistome bears a subangular ridge.

The pronotal disc is densely punctate, with nearly smooth, weakly microreticulate interspaces, each puncture containing a small recumbent seta. The elytral striae are distinct and marked by coarse punctures, while the intervals are flat and microreticulate. The sutural intervals have rows of smaller punctures, each containing a recumbent seta. The elytral apex is subtruncate, and in apical view, the ventral outline is bisinuate.

The femora have an indistinct anteroventral ridge that ends in the apical third. The metafemur bears a stridulatory patch near the tip. The dorsal edge of the tibiae shows a subbasal angulation and is dentate in both the pro- and mesotibiae. Abdominal ventrites 1 and 2 are nearly glabrous, with a few long, erect, narrow scales and a swollen lateral rim. In profile, ventrite 2 projects in a dentiform manner. Ventrite 5 is flat, coarsely punctate, and sparsely covered with suberect scales.

The penis has subparallel sides with a shallow constriction near the middle and a subtruncate apex lacking setae. The transfer apparatus is complex and broader than it is long. The apodemes are 1.5 times the length of the penis body, and the ductus ejaculatorius lacks a bulbus.

Elytral coloration varies from light to dark ferruginous. In females, the rostrum is nearly glabrous along the dorsal midline, with submedian rows of punctures and a laterally punctate-rugose texture. The epistome is simple.

== Distribution ==
Trigonopterus bawangensis is endemic to the Indonesian province of West Kalimantan, where it is known only from Mount Bawang. It has been recorded from elevations of 246–556 m (810–1,820 ft).
