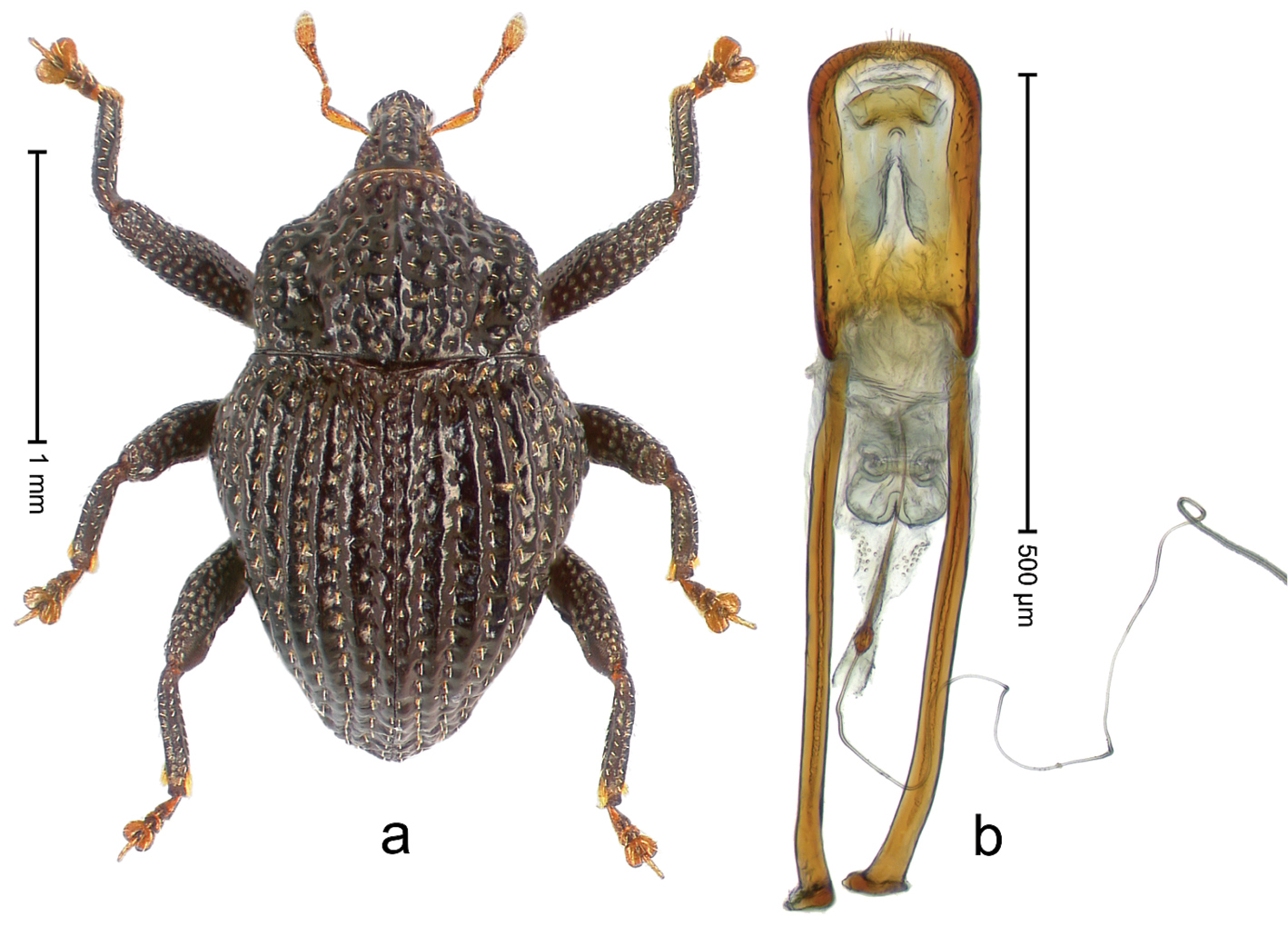
- Holotype specimen and penis

Scientific classification
- Kingdom: Animalia
- Phylum: Arthropoda
- Class: Insecta
- Order: Coleoptera
- Suborder: Polyphaga
- Infraorder: Cucujiformia
- Family: Curculionidae
- Genus: Trigonopterus
- Species: T. lombokensis

Binomial name
- Trigonopterus lombokensis Riedel, 2014

= Trigonopterus lombokensis =

Species of beetle

Trigonopterus lombokensis is a species of flightless weevil in the genus Trigonopterus from Indonesia.

== Etymology ==
The specific name is derived from that of the type locality.

== Description ==
Individuals measure 1.71–2.06 mm in length. General coloration is black, with rust colored tarsi and antennae.

== Range ==
The species is found around elevations of 625–1,345 metres (2,051–4,413 ft) on Santong, Senaru, Sesaot, and Tetebatu on the island of Lombok, part of the Indonesian province of West Nusa Tenggara.

== Phylogeny ==
T. lombokensis is part of the T. relictus species group.
