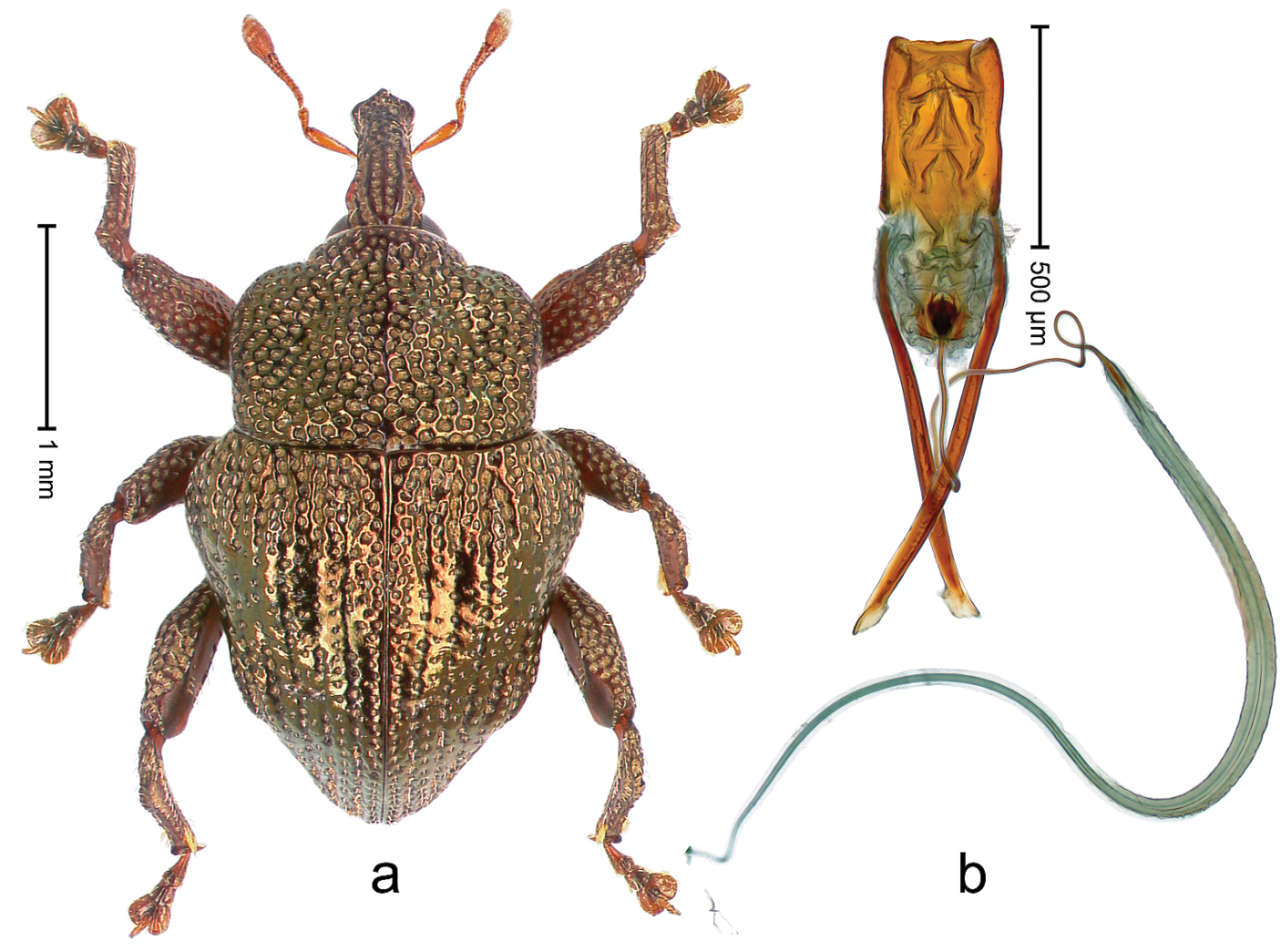

Scientific classification
- Kingdom: Animalia
- Phylum: Arthropoda
- Class: Insecta
- Order: Coleoptera
- Suborder: Polyphaga
- Infraorder: Cucujiformia
- Family: Curculionidae
- Genus: Trigonopterus
- Species: T. cupreus

Binomial name
- Trigonopterus cupreus Riedel, 2014

= Trigonopterus cupreus =

Species of beetle

Trigonopterus cupreus is a species of flightless weevil in the genus Trigonopterus from Indonesia. The species was described in 2014. The beetle is 2.43–3.05 mm long. The legs, head, and ventral surface are ferruginous, while the pronotum and elytra are coppery-reddish. Endemic to West Nusa Tenggara, where it is known from Batu Dulang and Tepal on the island of Sumbawa at elevations of 1,305–1,350 m (4,280–4,430 ft).

== Taxonomy ==
Trigonopterus cupreus was described by the entomologist Alexander Riedel in 2014 on the basis of an adult male specimen collected from Batu Dulang on the island of Sumbawa in Indonesia. The specific name is derived from the Latin word cupreus, meaning "copper-colored".

== Description ==
The beetle is 2.43–3.05 mm long. The legs, head, and ventral surface are ferruginous, while the pronotum and elytra are coppery-reddish. The body is elongate, with a pronounced constriction between the pronotum and elytra in dorsal view, and is dorsally convex in profile. The rostrum is scabrous and coarsely punctate in the apical half, while the basal half features a median ridge and a pair of submedian ridges. The intervening furrows are punctate and contain sparse rows of erect setae. The epistome bears a transverse, angular ridge with a distinct median denticle.

The pronotum has slightly diverging sides that round anterolaterally into a subapical constriction. Its disc is coarsely punctate and reticulate, with a pair of submedian impressions and an indistinct median ridge. Each puncture contains a small, inconspicuous seta. The elytra have swollen, laterally projecting humeri, and intervals 5 and 6 are swollen behind the middle, gently projecting from the lateral outline. The striae are indistinct, and the intervals are flat and punctate. The base and apex of the elytra are densely and coarsely punctate, while the transverse band between the humeral and subapical swellings is less densely punctate.

The anteroventral ridge of the femora is distinct, forming a large tooth in the meso- and metafemora. The metafemur also bears a subapical stridulatory patch. The dorsal edge of the tibiae shows a subbasal angulation, with a blunt tooth in the protibia, an acute tooth in the mesotibia, and denticulation in the metatibia. Abdominal ventrite 5 is flat and coarsely punctate.

The penis has subparallel sides and a subtruncate, weakly rounded apex. A fringe of conglutinate flattened setae surrounds the apex, interrupted by a glabrous median notch. The transfer apparatus is compact, and the apodemes are 2.4 times the length of the penis body. The ductus ejaculatorius contains a bulbus.

The pronotum and elytra may show a bronze, reddish coppery, or greenish lustre. Females have a more slender body. The female rostrum is dorsally punctate-rugose, with a glabrous median ridge bordered by rows of punctures and a pair of sublateral furrows. The epistome is simple. The female pronotum is approximately 1.1 times as wide as it is long, while in males it is about 1.3 times as wide as it is long. Female elytra are subovate, with a convex lateral contour extending to the apex; the humeri and intervals 5–6 are unmodified. Female abdominal ventrite 5 bears sparse, subrecumbent setae.

== Distribution ==
Trigonopterus cupreus is endemic to the Indonesian province of West Nusa Tenggara, where it is known from Batu Dulang and Tepal on the island of Sumbawa. It has been recorded at elevations of 1,305–1,350 m (4,280–4,430 ft).
