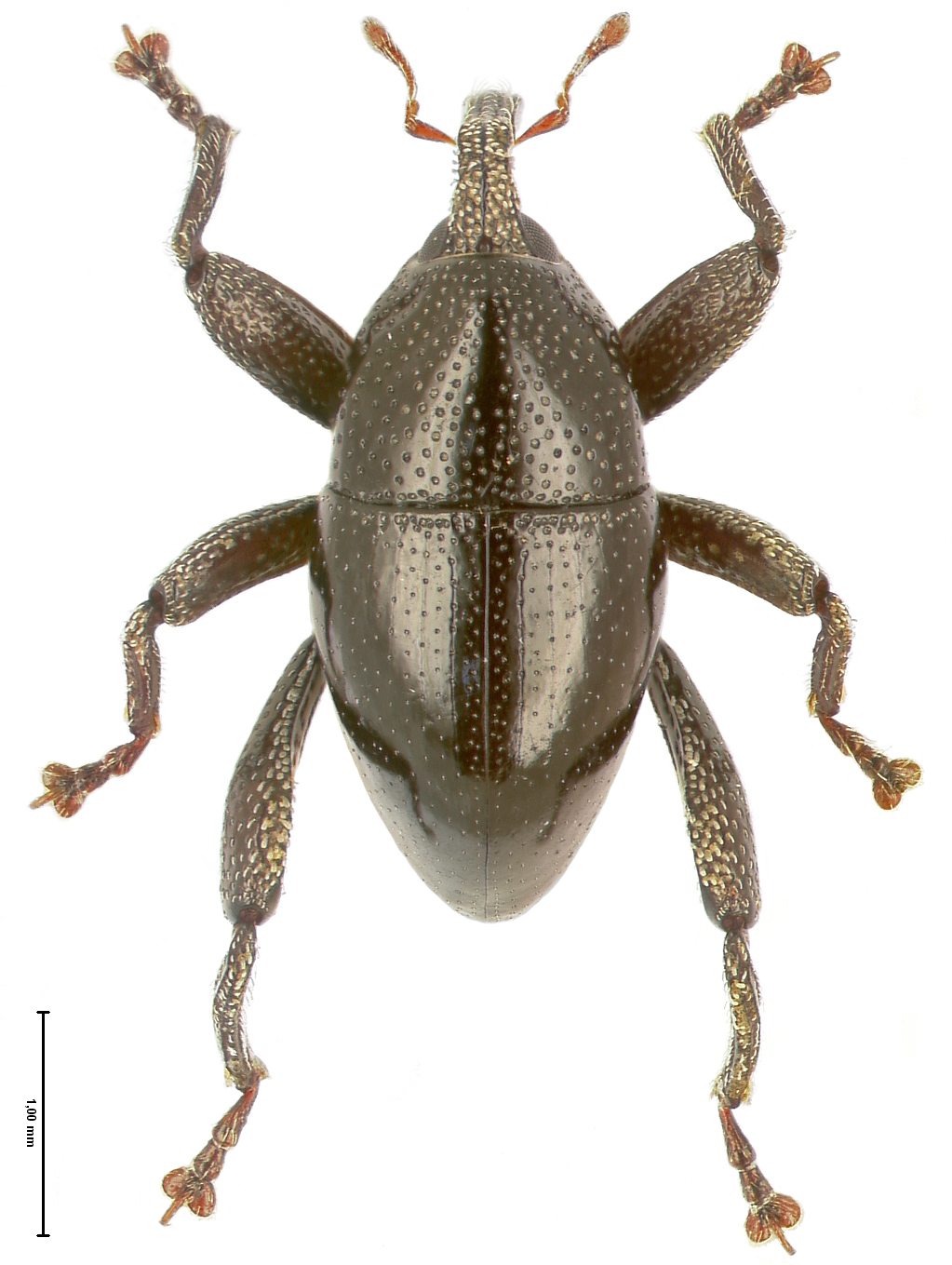
- Trigonopterus vandekampi from New Guinea

Scientific classification
- Kingdom: Animalia
- Phylum: Arthropoda
- Clade: Pancrustacea
- Class: Insecta
- Order: Coleoptera
- Suborder: Polyphaga
- Infraorder: Cucujiformia
- Superfamily: Curculionoidea
- Family: Curculionidae
- Subfamily: Cryptorhynchinae
- Genus: Trigonopterus; Fauvel, 1862

Type species
- Trigonopterus insignis Fauvel, 1862

Synonyms
- Idotasia Pascoe, 1871; Eurysia Pascoe, 1885; Mimidotasia Voss, 1960; Microgymnapterus Voss, 1960

= Trigonopterus =

Genus of beetles

Trigonopterus is a genus of flightless weevils placed in the Cryptorhynchinae of Curculionidae. It is distributed in Australia, Indonesia and Melanesia. About 90 species had been formally described until March 2013, when a single paper more than doubled this number, agreeing with previous studies and a systematic barcoding study that many more species have yet to be described. As of October 2021, there were 480 described species.

The center of its diversity appears to be New Guinea where 51 or more species can be found in a single locality. Many of them are very similar to each other, but male genital characters and DNA barcoding allow a safe identification.

In January 2016, a paper was published that revised the Australian species within this genus. That paper described 24 new species and indicated the potential for more research into undescribed Australian species within this genus.

In April 2016, a paper was published that described four new species in this genus from the island of New Britain. The paper postulated that more species of this genus presently unknown to science may exist on the island. It emphasised the importance of prioritising further research due to the ongoing destruction of the habitat of these species.

Further papers described 133 new species from Sulawesi, where only one species (T. fulvicornis) had previously been recorded.

The genus can be diagnosed among wingless cryptorhynchine weevils by the absence of a metanepisternum and by a synapomorphic structure of the tarsus with minute claws and a deeply incavated articulation of tarsomere 4. The metathoracic spiracle located externally at the side of the metaventrite is a unique feature and may ensure sufficient respiration during thanatosis.

Trigonopterus species inhabit primary tropical forests, both on foliage and edaphic in the litter layer. They have a marked tendency to endemism with many species only known from a single locality. Their primary defence against predators is apparent death or thanatosis. An animated 3D model of a Trigonopterus weevil reveals a number of mechanisms to maintain a stable defensive position.

== Biological screw joint ==
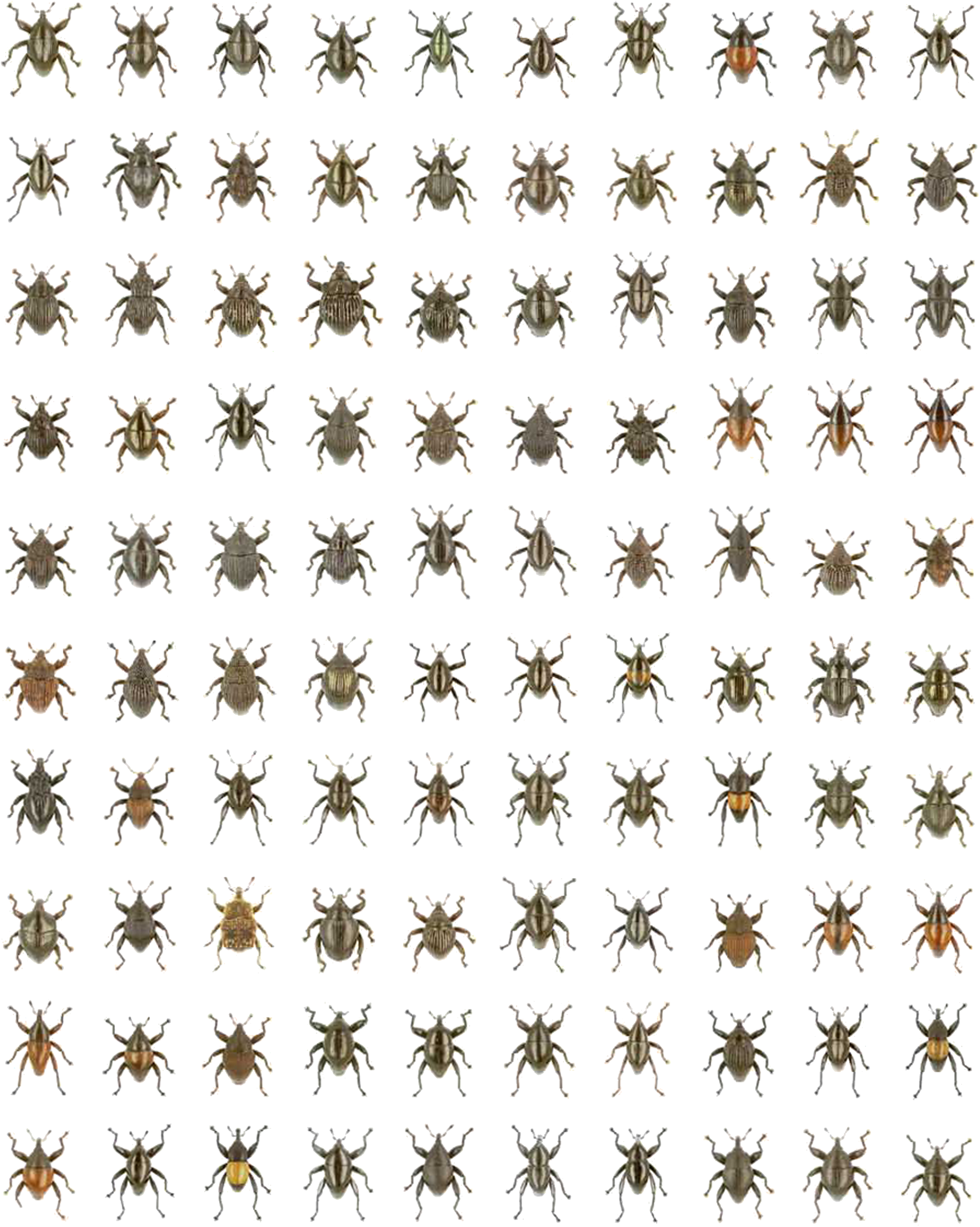
100 Trigonopterus species described in 2013

The arthropod hip-leg joint consists of two parts - the coxa (or the hip) and the trochanter (or the head of the arthropod leg femur). The coxa, in the case of Trigonopterus oblongus, resembles a nut, and it has a thread running along its inner surface with an angular span of 345°. The trochanter resembles the screw. It is rod-shaped with a large external spiral flange, having an angular span of 410°, in excess of a full circle, which functions as a thread. When the leg muscles of a beetle are stretched, the screw turns. Though the screw-thread provide for very large angular rotation, the front legs are capable of rotating by 90°, while their hind legs can rotate by 130°.

== Evolution ==
The screw-and-nut system has now been found to be present in all 15 weevil species examined by the scientists and appears to be a hitherto unknown anatomical feature of weevils. It has been estimated that weevils evolved this system about 100 million years ago. It is surmised that the development of this feature provided additional flexibility which permitted weevils to improve their climbing abilities, helped them keep steady when at rest, and to give a stronger leverage for piercing by the snout.

== Species ==
- Trigonopterus abnormis Riedel, 2019
- Trigonopterus acuminatus Riedel, 2014
- Trigonopterus acutus Narakusumo & Riedel, 2021
- Trigonopterus adspersus Riedel, 2019
- Trigonopterus aeneipennis Riedel, 2013
- Trigonopterus aeneomicans Riedel, 2014
- Trigonopterus aeneoniveus Fairmaire, 1879
- Trigonopterus aeneus Riedel, 2013
- Trigonopterus aequalis (Pascoe, 1872)
- Trigonopterus agathis Riedel, 2013
- Trigonopterus agilis Riedel, 2013
- Trigonopterus alaspurwensis Riedel, 2014
- Trigonopterus albidosparsus (Lea, 1913)
- Trigonopterus albopunctatus Rheinheimer, 2013
- Trigonopterus allaetus Riedel, 2016
- Trigonopterus allopatricus Riedel, 2014
- Trigonopterus allotopus Riedel, 2014
- Trigonopterus ambangensis Riedel, 2019
- Trigonopterus ampanensis Riedel, 2019
- Trigonopterus amphoralis Marshall, 1925
- Trigonopterus ampliatus (Pascoe, 1885)
- Trigonopterus amplipennis Riedel, 2013
- Trigonopterus analis Riedel, 2019
- Trigonopterus ancora Narakusumo & Riedel, 2021
- Trigonopterus ancoruncus Riedel, 2013
- Trigonopterus angulatus Riedel, 2013
- Trigonopterus angulicollis Riedel, 2014
- Trigonopterus angustus Riedel, 2013
- Trigonopterus anthracinus (Voss, 1960)
- Trigonopterus anthrax Fairmaire, 1881
- Trigonopterus apicalis Riedel, 2013
- Trigonopterus arachnobas Riedel, 2019
- Trigonopterus arcanus Narakusumo & Riedel, 2021
- Trigonopterus argopurensis Riedel, 2014
- Trigonopterus arjunensis Riedel, 2014
- Trigonopterus armatus Riedel, 2013
- Trigonopterus armipes Riedel, 2019
- Trigonopterus artemis Riedel, 2019
- Trigonopterus ascendens Riedel, 2013
- Trigonopterus asper Riedel, 2014
- Trigonopterus asterix Riedel, 2019
- Trigonopterus athertonensis Riedel, 2016
- Trigonopterus attenboroughi Riedel, 2014
- Trigonopterus atuf Narakusumo & Riedel, 2019
- Trigonopterus augur Riedel, 2013
- Trigonopterus australinasutus Riedel, 2016
- Trigonopterus australis Riedel, 2016
- Trigonopterus bakeri (Hustache, 1925)
- Trigonopterus baliensis Riedel, 2014
- Trigonopterus balimensis Riedel, 2013
- Trigonopterus barbipes Riedel, 2019
- Trigonopterus basalis Riedel, 2013
- Trigonopterus basimaculatus (Voss, 1960)
- Trigonopterus batukarensis Riedel, 2014
- Trigonopterus bawangensis Riedel, 2014
- Trigonopterus bicolor Marshall, 1921
- Trigonopterus biguttatoides Rheinheimer, 2013
- Trigonopterus biguttatus Rheinheimer, 2013
- Trigonopterus binodulus Riedel, 2014
- Trigonopterus binotatus Marshall, 1921
- Trigonopterus bisignatus Riedel, 2016
- Trigonopterus bisinuatus Riedel, 2016
- Trigonopterus bonthainensis Riedel, 2019
- Trigonopterus boolbunensis Riedel, 2016
- Trigonopterus bornensis Riedel, 2014
- Trigonopterus bryani Marshall, 1931
- Trigonopterus caesipes Marshall, 1931
- Trigonopterus cahyoi Riedel, 2014
- Trigonopterus carinatus Rheinheimer, 2013
- Trigonopterus carinirostris Riedel, 2019
- Trigonopterus carolineae Zimmerman, 1941
- Trigonopterus castaneipennis Riedel, 2019
- Trigonopterus caudatus Heller, 1920
- Trigonopterus celebensis Riedel, 2019
- Trigonopterus chewbacca Van Dam & Riedel, 2016
- Trigonopterus cirripes Riedel, 2019
- Trigonopterus collaris Riedel, 2019
- Trigonopterus conformis Riedel, 2013
- Trigonopterus conicus Rheinheimer, 2013
- Trigonopterus constrictus Riedel, 2013
- Trigonopterus convexus (Faust, 1898)
- Trigonopterus cooktownensis Riedel, 2016
- Trigonopterus coriarius Heller, 1920
- Trigonopterus corona Narakusumo & Riedel, 2021
- Trigonopterus costatulus Riedel, 2019
- Trigonopterus costatus Riedel, 2013
- Trigonopterus costicollis Riedel, 2013
- Trigonopterus costipennis Riedel, 2014
- Trigonopterus crassicornis Riedel, 2013
- Trigonopterus crenulatus Riedel, 2019
- Trigonopterus cribratus (Faust, 1899)
- Trigonopterus cribrellicollis Fairmaire, 1881
- Trigonopterus cricki Riedel, 2019
- Trigonopterus crinipes Marshall, 1931
- Trigonopterus cuneatus (Faust, 1899)
- Trigonopterus cuneipennis Riedel, 2013
- Trigonopterus cuprescens Riedel, 2014
- Trigonopterus cupreus Riedel, 2014
- Trigonopterus curtus (Voss, 1960)
- Trigonopterus curvipes Riedel, 2019
- Trigonopterus cyclopensis Riedel, 2013
- Trigonopterus dacrycarpi Riedel, 2014
- Trigonopterus daintreensis Riedel, 2016
- Trigonopterus dakoensis Narakusumo & Riedel, 2021
- Trigonopterus darwini Riedel, 2019
- Trigonopterus daun Narakusumo & Riedel, 2021
- Trigonopterus delapan Riedel, 2014
- Trigonopterus densatus (Faust, 1899)
- Trigonopterus dentipes Riedel, 2014
- Trigonopterus dentirostris Riedel, 2013
- Trigonopterus deplanatus Riedel, 2016
- Trigonopterus diengensis Riedel, 2014
- Trigonopterus difficilis (Faust, 1899)
- Trigonopterus difformis Rheinheimer, 2013
- Trigonopterus dilaticollis (Faust, 1898)
- Trigonopterus dimorphus Riedel, 2014
- Trigonopterus discoidalis Riedel, 2013
- Trigonopterus disruptus Riedel, 2014
- Trigonopterus diversicollis Heller, 1920
- Trigonopterus dromedarius Riedel, 2013
- Trigonopterus dua Riedel, 2014
- Trigonopterus duabelas Riedel, 2014
- Trigonopterus durus Riedel, 2013
- Trigonopterus ebriosus (Pascoe, 1871)
- Trigonopterus echinatus Riedel, 2014
- Trigonopterus echinus Riedel, 2013
- Trigonopterus edaphus Riedel, 2013
- Trigonopterus ejaculatorius Riedel, 2019
- Trigonopterus ellipticus (Pascoe, 1871)
- Trigonopterus empat Riedel, 2014
- Trigonopterus enam Riedel, 2014
- Trigonopterus ephippiatus (Faust, 1899)
- Trigonopterus eremitus Riedel, 2013
- Trigonopterus euops Riedel, 2013
- Trigonopterus evanidus Rheinheimer, 2013
- Trigonopterus ewok Narakusumo & Riedel, 2021
- Trigonopterus femoralis (Faust, 1898)
- Trigonopterus femoridens Rheinheimer, 2013
- Trigonopterus ferrugineus Riedel, 2013
- Trigonopterus finniganensis Riedel, 2016
- Trigonopterus fissitarsis Riedel, 2014
- Trigonopterus flavomaculatus (Voss, 1960)
- Trigonopterus florensis Riedel, 2014
- Trigonopterus foveatus Riedel, 2014
- Trigonopterus fraterculus Riedel, 2016
- Trigonopterus fulgidus Riedel, 2014
- Trigonopterus fulvicornis (Pascoe, 1885)
- Trigonopterus fuscipes Riedel, 2019
- Trigonopterus fusiformis Riedel, 2013
- Trigonopterus garradungensis Riedel, 2016
- Trigonopterus gedensis Riedel, 2014
- Trigonopterus gibbirostris (Faust, 1899)
- Trigonopterus glaber Riedel, 2013
- Trigonopterus globatus (Voss, 1960)
- Trigonopterus gonatoceros Riedel, 2013
- Trigonopterus gracilipes Riedel, 2019
- Trigonopterus granum Riedel, 2013
- Trigonopterus grimmi Riedel, 2022
- Trigonopterus gundala Narakusumo & Riedel, 2021
- Trigonopterus halimunensis Riedel, 2014
- Trigonopterus hartleyensis Riedel, 2016
- Trigonopterus hasenpuschi Riedel, 2016
- Trigonopterus hassleri Rheinheimer, 2013
- Trigonopterus heberti Riedel, 2019
- Trigonopterus helios Riedel, 2013
- Trigonopterus heteropunctatus Heller, 1920
- Trigonopterus hirsutus Riedel, 2019
- Trigonopterus hitoloorum Riedel, 2013
- Trigonopterus honjensis Riedel, 2014
- Trigonopterus hoppla Narakusumo & Riedel, 2021
- Trigonopterus humilis Riedel, 2019
- Trigonopterus hypocrita Riedel, 2019
- Trigonopterus idefix Riedel, 2019
- Trigonopterus ijensis Riedel, 2014
- Trigonopterus illex (Faust, 1899)
- Trigonopterus illitus (Faust, 1899)
- Trigonopterus imitatus Riedel, 2013
- Trigonopterus impar (Faust, 1898)
- Trigonopterus impressicollis Riedel, 2019
- Trigonopterus incendium Riedel, 2019
- Trigonopterus inclusus (Pascoe, 1871)
- Trigonopterus incognitus Riedel, 2019
- Trigonopterus indigenus Riedel, 2019
- Trigonopterus inflatus Riedel, 2013
- Trigonopterus inhonestus Riedel, 2019
- Trigonopterus insignis Fauvel, 1862
- Trigonopterus insularis Riedel, 2013
- Trigonopterus interpositus (Voss, 1960)
- Trigonopterus invalidus Riedel, 2019
- Trigonopterus irregularis Riedel, 2013
- Trigonopterus ixodiformis Riedel, 2013
- Trigonopterus jasminae Riedel, 2019
- Trigonopterus javensis Riedel, 2014
- Trigonopterus jekelii (Fauvel, 1867)
- Trigonopterus johorensis Riedel, 2022
- Trigonopterus kakimerah Narakusumo & Riedel, 2021
- Trigonopterus kalimantanensis Riedel, 2014
- Trigonopterus kanawiorum Riedel, 2013
- Trigonopterus katayoi Riedel, 2013
- Trigonopterus katopasensis Narakusumo & Riedel, 2021
- Trigonopterus kintamanensis Riedel, 2014
- Trigonopterus klabatensis Riedel, 2019
- Trigonopterus klatakanensis Riedel, 2014
- Trigonopterus kolakensis Riedel, 2019
- Trigonopterus kotamobagensis Riedel, 2019
- Trigonopterus koveorum Riedel, 2013
- Trigonopterus kumbang Narakusumo & Riedel, 2019
- Trigonopterus kurandensis Riedel, 2016
- Trigonopterus kurulu Riedel, 2013
- Trigonopterus kuscheli Rheinheimer, 2013
- Trigonopterus laetus (Lea, 1913)
- Trigonopterus laevigatus Riedel, 2019
- Trigonopterus lambirensis Riedel, 2022
- Trigonopterus lampros Riedel, 2019
- Trigonopterus lampungensis Riedel, 2014
- Trigonopterus laratensis Narakusumo & Riedel, 2019
- Trigonopterus latipennis Riedel, 2019
- Trigonopterus latipes Riedel, 2014
- Trigonopterus lekiorum Riedel, 2013
- Trigonopterus lescheni Rheinheimer, 2013
- Trigonopterus lewisensis Riedel, 2016
- Trigonopterus lima Riedel, 2014
- Trigonopterus linauensis Riedel, 2022
- Trigonopterus lineatus Riedel, 2013
- Trigonopterus lineellus Riedel, 2013
- Trigonopterus lombokensis Riedel, 2014
- Trigonopterus lompobattangensis Riedel, 2019
- Trigonopterus luwukensis Riedel, 2019
- Trigonopterus maculatus Riedel, 2013
- Trigonopterus mahawuensis Riedel, 2019
- Trigonopterus manadensis Riedel, 2019
- Trigonopterus mangkutanensis Riedel, 2019
- Trigonopterus matakensis Narakusumo & Riedel, 2021
- Trigonopterus matalibaruensis Riedel, 2019
- Trigonopterus melas (Faust, 1899)
- Trigonopterus mendax Marshall, 1931
- Trigonopterus merophysioides Fairmaire, 1881
- Trigonopterus merubetirensis Riedel, 2014
- Trigonopterus mesai Riedel, 2019
- Trigonopterus mesehensis Riedel, 2014
- Trigonopterus micans Riedel, 2014
- Trigonopterus microreticulatus Riedel, Trnka & Wahab
- Trigonopterus mimicus Riedel, 2013
- Trigonopterus minahassae Riedel, 2019
- Trigonopterus minutus (Voss, 1960)
- Trigonopterus misellus Riedel, 2014
- Trigonopterus moatensis Riedel, 2019
- Trigonopterus modoindingensis Riedel, 2019
- Trigonopterus moduai Narakusumo & Riedel, 2021
- Trigonopterus mons Narakusumo & Riedel, 2021
- Trigonopterus montanus Riedel, 2016
- Trigonopterus monteithi Riedel, 2016
- Trigonopterus monticola Riedel, 2013
- Trigonopterus montivagus Riedel, 2013
- Trigonopterus moreaorum Riedel, 2013
- Trigonopterus morokensis (Faust, 1899)
- Trigonopterus mossmanensis Riedel, 2016
- Trigonopterus mulensis Riedel, 2022
- Trigonopterus myops Riedel, 2013
- Trigonopterus nangiorum Riedel, 2013
- Trigonopterus nanus Riedel, 2019
- Trigonopterus nasutus (Pascoe, 1871)
- Trigonopterus neglectus (Faust, 1899)
- Trigonopterus nitidulus Riedel, 2019
- Trigonopterus nothofagorum Riedel, 2013
- Trigonopterus obelix Riedel, 2019
- Trigonopterus oberprieleri Riedel, 2016
- Trigonopterus oblongus (Pascoe, 1885)
- Trigonopterus obnixus (Faust, 1899)
- Trigonopterus obsidianus Van Dam & Riedel, 2016
- Trigonopterus ovalipunctatus Riedel, 2019
- Trigonopterus ovatulus Riedel, 2019
- Trigonopterus ovatus Riedel, 2013
- Trigonopterus oviformis Riedel, 2013
- Trigonopterus pagaranganensis Riedel, 2019
- Trigonopterus palawanensis Riedel, 2014
- Trigonopterus palopensis Riedel, 2019
- Trigonopterus pangandaranensis Riedel, 2014
- Trigonopterus paracollaris Riedel, 2019
- Trigonopterus paraflorensis Riedel, 2014
- Trigonopterus paramoduai Narakusumo & Riedel, 2021
- Trigonopterus pararugosus Riedel, 2014
- Trigonopterus parasumbawensis Riedel, 2014
- Trigonopterus parumsquamosus Riedel, 2013
- Trigonopterus parvulus Riedel, 2013
- Trigonopterus parvus Rheinheimer, 2013
- Trigonopterus paucisquamosus (Heller, 1915)
- Trigonopterus pauper Riedel, 2019
- Trigonopterus pauxillus Riedel, 2014
- Trigonopterus payungensis Riedel, 2014
- Trigonopterus pembertoni (Zimmerman, 1938)
- Trigonopterus pendolensis Riedel, 2019
- Trigonopterus phoenix Riedel, 2013
- Trigonopterus pilosipes Rheinheimer, 2013
- Trigonopterus plicicollis Riedel, 2013
- Trigonopterus politoides Riedel, 2013
- Trigonopterus politus (Faust, 1899)
- Trigonopterus pomberimbensis Narakusumo & Riedel, 2021
- Trigonopterus pompangeensis Narakusumo & Riedel, 2021
- Trigonopterus porcatus Riedel, 2014
- Trigonopterus porg Narakusumo & Riedel, 2019
- Trigonopterus posoensis Riedel, 2019
- Trigonopterus prismae Riedel, 2019
- Trigonopterus procurtus Riedel, 2019
- Trigonopterus proximus (Voss, 1960)
- Trigonopterus pseudallotopus Riedel, 2019
- Trigonopterus pseudanalis Riedel, 2019
- Trigonopterus pseudinsignis Rheinheimer, 2013
- Trigonopterus pseudoflorensis Riedel, 2014
- Trigonopterus pseudogranum Riedel, 2013
- Trigonopterus pseudomanadensis Riedel, 2019
- Trigonopterus pseudonasutus Riedel, 2013
- Trigonopterus pseudosimulans Riedel, 2019
- Trigonopterus pseudosumbawensis Riedel, 2014
- Trigonopterus pseudofulvicornis Riedel, 2019
- Trigonopterus pseudovalipunctatus Riedel, 2019
- Trigonopterus pseudovatulus Riedel, 2019
- Trigonopterus ptolycoides Riedel, 2013
- Trigonopterus pulchellus (Pascoe, 1885)
- Trigonopterus pulicaris (Pascoe, 1885)
- Trigonopterus pullus (Voss, 1960)
- Trigonopterus pumilus Riedel, 2019
- Trigonopterus punctatoseriatus Riedel, 2014
- Trigonopterus puncticollis Van Dam & Riedel, 2016
- Trigonopterus punctulatus Riedel, 2013
- Trigonopterus pusillus (Faust, 1899)
- Trigonopterus puspoi Narakusumo & Riedel, 2021
- Trigonopterus quadrimaculatus Rheinheimer, 2013
- Trigonopterus ragaorum Riedel, 2013
- Trigonopterus ranakensis Riedel, 2014
- Trigonopterus rantepao Riedel, 2019
- Trigonopterus relictus Riedel, 2014
- Trigonopterus reticulatus Riedel, 2019
- Trigonopterus rhinoceros Riedel, 2013
- Trigonopterus rhomboidalis Riedel, 2013
- Trigonopterus rhombiformis Riedel, 2019
- Trigonopterus rinjaniensis Riedel, 2014
- Trigonopterus robertsi Riedel, 2016
- Trigonopterus roensis Riedel, 2014
- Trigonopterus rosichoni Narakusumo & Riedel, 2021
- Trigonopterus rostralis (Lea, 1928)
- Trigonopterus rotundatus Riedel, 2019
- Trigonopterus rotundulus Riedel, 2019
- Trigonopterus rubidus Narakusumo & Riedel, 2021
- Trigonopterus rubiginosus Riedel, 2013
- Trigonopterus rubripennis Riedel, 2013
- Trigonopterus rudis Riedel, 2019
- Trigonopterus rufibasis Riedel, 2013
- Trigonopterus rufipennis (Pascoe, 1885)
- Trigonopterus rufipes Riedel, 2019
- Trigonopterus rufipterus Rheinheimer, 2013
- Trigonopterus rufithorax Rheinheimer, 2013
- Trigonopterus rugosostriatus Riedel, 2014
- Trigonopterus rugosus Riedel, 2014
- Trigonopterus rutengensis Riedel, 2014
- Trigonopterus saltator Riedel, 2014
- Trigonopterus salubris (Faust, 1898)
- Trigonopterus sampunensis Riedel, 2019
- Trigonopterus sampuragensis Riedel, 2019
- Trigonopterus santubongensis Riedel, 2014
- Trigonopterus sarawakensis Riedel, 2022
- Trigonopterus sarinoi Narakusumo & Riedel, 2021
- Trigonopterus sasak Riedel, 2014
- Trigonopterus satu Riedel, 2014
- Trigonopterus satyrus Riedel, 2019
- Trigonopterus scabripes Riedel, 2019
- Trigonopterus scabrosus Riedel, 2013
- Trigonopterus scaphiformis Riedel, 2019
- Trigonopterus scaphioides (Pascoe, 1871)
- Trigonopterus scharfi Riedel, 2013
- Trigonopterus schulzi Riedel, 2014
- Trigonopterus scissops Riedel, 2013
- Trigonopterus scitulus Riedel, 2019
- Trigonopterus sculptirostris (Lea, 1928)
- Trigonopterus sculpturatus Rheinheimer, 2013
- Trigonopterus sebelas Riedel, 2014
- Trigonopterus seclusus (Faust, 1899)
- Trigonopterus sejunctus (Faust, 1899)
- Trigonopterus selaruensis Narakusumo & Riedel, 2019
- Trigonopterus selayarensis Riedel, 2019
- Trigonopterus sellatus (Faust, 1899)
- Trigonopterus sembilan Riedel, 2014
- Trigonopterus semicribrosus Fairmaire, 1881
- Trigonopterus semirubrus (Hustache, 1925)
- Trigonopterus sepuluh Riedel, 2014
- Trigonopterus seriatus Riedel, 2014
- Trigonopterus serratifemur Riedel, 2014
- Trigonopterus serratipes Marshall, 1931
- Trigonopterus serripes Riedel, 2019
- Trigonopterus seticnemis Riedel, 2019
- Trigonopterus setifer Riedel, 2014
- Trigonopterus setipoides Rheinheimer, 2013
- Trigonopterus setipus Rheinheimer, 2013
- Trigonopterus sexmaculatus Rheinheimer, 2013
- Trigonopterus siamensis Riedel, 2022
- Trigonopterus signicollis Riedel, 2013
- Trigonopterus silaliensis Van Dam & Riedel, 2016
- Trigonopterus silvestris Riedel, 2014
- Trigonopterus silvicola Riedel, 2019
- Trigonopterus similis (Faust, 1899)
- Trigonopterus simulans Riedel, 2013
- Trigonopterus singaporensis Riedel, 2022
- Trigonopterus singkawangensis Riedel, 2014
- Trigonopterus singularis Riedel, 2014
- Trigonopterus sinuatus Riedel, 2014
- Trigonopterus soiorum Riedel, 2013
- Trigonopterus solidus (Faust, 1899)
- Trigonopterus sordidus Riedel, 2013
- Trigonopterus squalidulus Riedel, 2019
- Trigonopterus squalidus Riedel, 2014
- Trigonopterus squamirostris Riedel, 2013
- Trigonopterus squamosus (Lea, 1928)
- Trigonopterus striatipennis (Lea, 1928)
- Trigonopterus striatus Riedel, 2013
- Trigonopterus strigatus Riedel, 2013
- Trigonopterus strombosceroides Riedel, 2013
- Trigonopterus subglabratus Riedel, 2013
- Trigonopterus submetallicus Marshall, 1921
- Trigonopterus subrubricollis Heller, 1920
- Trigonopterus sulawesiensis Riedel, 2019
- Trigonopterus sulcatus Riedel, 2013
- Trigonopterus sumatrensis Riedel, 2014
- Trigonopterus sumbawensis Riedel, 2014
- Trigonopterus sundaicus Riedel, 2014
- Trigonopterus sutrisnoi Narakusumo & Riedel, 2021
- Trigonopterus suturaelevata Rheinheimer, 2013
- Trigonopterus suturalis Riedel, 2014
- Trigonopterus suturatus Riedel, 2019
- Trigonopterus syarbis Riedel, 2014
- Trigonopterus taenzleri Riedel, 2013
- Trigonopterus talpa Riedel, 2013
- Trigonopterus tanimbarensis Narakusumo & Riedel, 2019
- Trigonopterus tanah Narakusumo & Riedel, 2021
- Trigonopterus tatorensis Riedel, 2019
- Trigonopterus taurekaorum Riedel, 2013
- Trigonopterus tejokusumoi Narakusumo & Riedel, 2021
- Trigonopterus telagensis Riedel, 2014
- Trigonopterus tenuipes Riedel, 2019
- Trigonopterus tepalensis Riedel, 2014
- Trigonopterus terraereginae Riedel, 2016
- Trigonopterus tialeorum Riedel, 2013
- Trigonopterus tibialis Riedel, 2013
- Trigonopterus tiga Riedel, 2014
- Trigonopterus toboliensis Narakusumo & Riedel, 2021
- Trigonopterus tolitoliensis Narakusumo & Riedel, 2021
- Trigonopterus tomohonensis Riedel, 2019
- Trigonopterus toraja Riedel, 2019
- Trigonopterus tounensis Narakusumo & Riedel, 2021
- Trigonopterus tridentatus Riedel, 2013
- Trigonopterus trigonopterus Riedel, 2014
- Trigonopterus triradiatus Narakusumo & Riedel, 2019
- Trigonopterus tujuh Riedel, 2014
- Trigonopterus ujungkulonensis Riedel, 2014
- Trigonopterus unicolor Rheinheimer, 2013
- Trigonopterus uniformis Riedel, 2013
- Trigonopterus unyil Narakusumo & Riedel, 2021
- Trigonopterus vandekampi Riedel, 2010
- Trigonopterus vanus (Faust, 1899)
- Trigonopterus variabilis Riedel, 2013
- Trigonopterus variolosus Riedel, 2014
- Trigonopterus velaris Riedel, 2013
- Trigonopterus verrucosus Riedel, 2013
- Trigonopterus vicinus Riedel, 2019
- Trigonopterus viduus Riedel, 2019
- Trigonopterus violaceus Riedel, 2013
- Trigonopterus viridescens Riedel, 2013
- Trigonopterus volcanorum Riedel, 2019
- Trigonopterus vulcanicus Riedel, 2014
- Trigonopterus wallacei Riedel, 2014
- Trigonopterus wamenaensis Riedel, 2013
- Trigonopterus wangiwangiensis Riedel, 2019
- Trigonopterus wariorum Riedel, 2013
- Trigonopterus watsoni Riedel, 2019
- Trigonopterus yoda Riedel, 2019
- Trigonopterus yorkensis Riedel, 2016
- Trigonopterus zonatus Heller, 1920
- Trigonopterus zygops Riedel, 2013

== Gallery ==
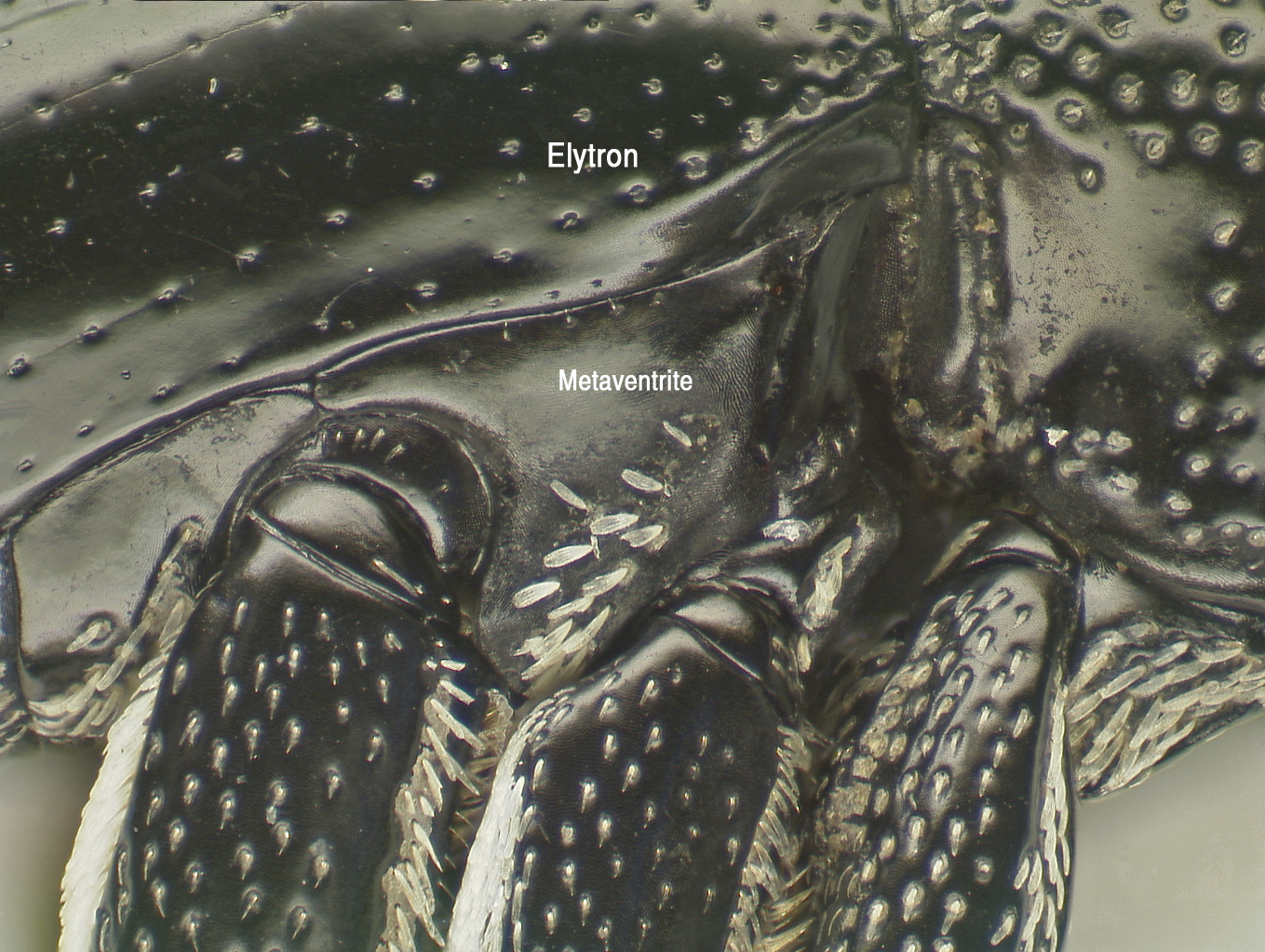
The lateral aspect on thorax of the weevil Trigonopterus oblongus. In this genus, the metanepisternite is absent and the elytron touches the metaventrite (indicated).

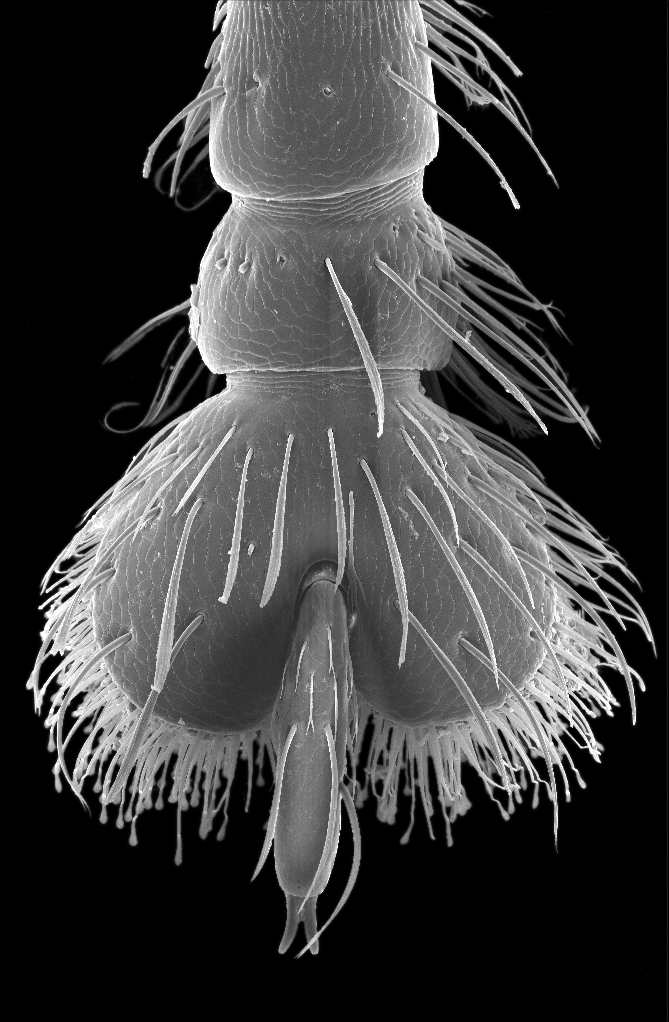
Metatarsus of weevil Trigonopterus sp. (from Java); scanning electron micrograph

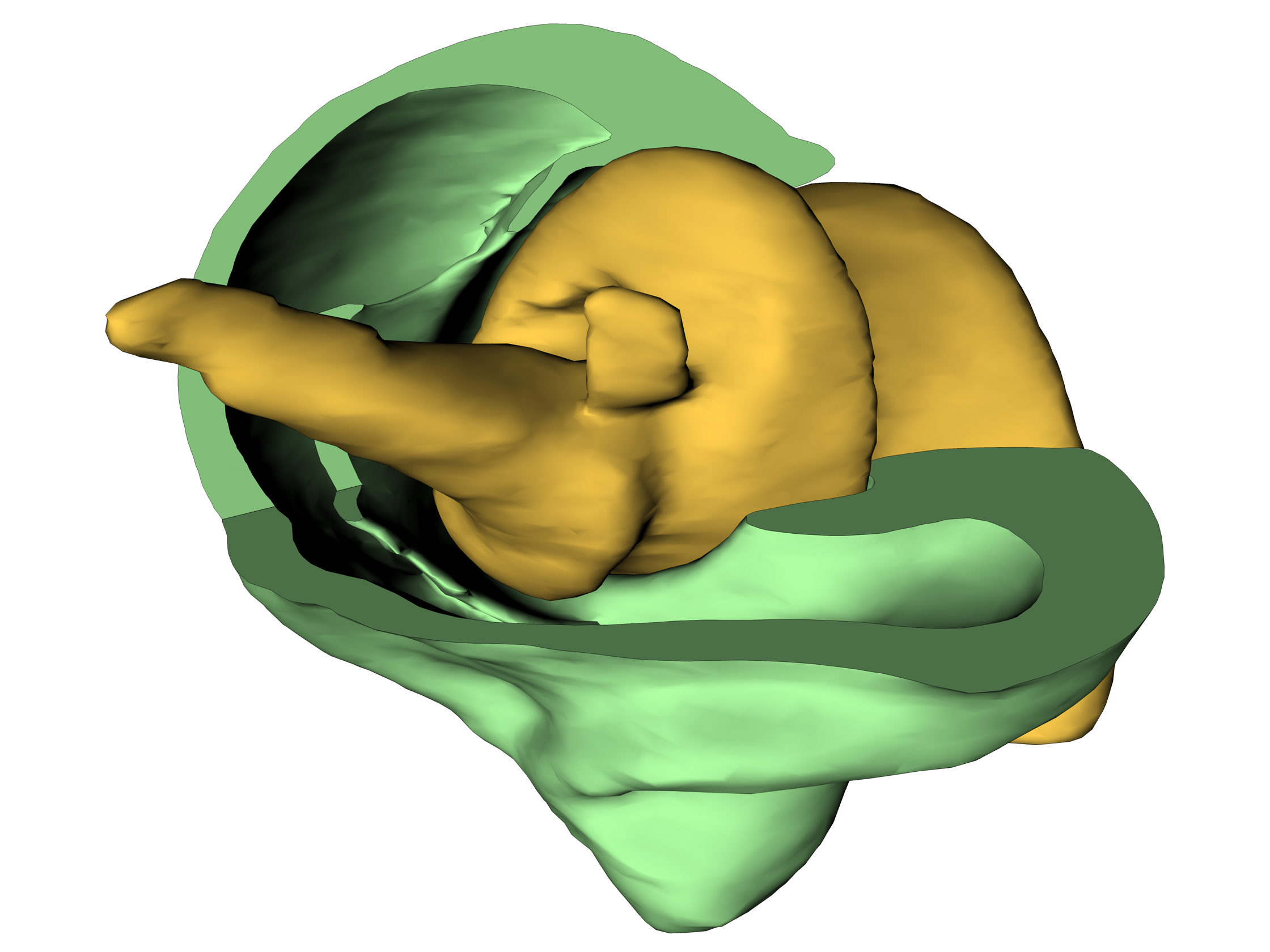
Diagram of the biological screw in the weevil Trigonopterus oblongus
