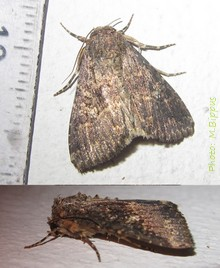

Scientific classification
- Domain: Eukaryota
- Kingdom: Animalia
- Phylum: Arthropoda
- Class: Insecta
- Order: Lepidoptera
- Superfamily: Noctuoidea
- Family: Erebidae
- Tribe: Catephiini
- Genus: Catephia; Ochsenheimer, 1816

Synonyms
- Idicara Walker, 1863; Mageutica Hampson, 1926; Zarima Moore, 1882

= Catephia =

Genus of moths

Catephia is a genus of moths of the family Erebidae. Most species of this genus are found in Africa.

== Description ==
Palpi smooth and reaching just above vertex of head. Thorax hairy. Abdomen with dorsal tufts and ridges of scales on proximal segments. Tibia hairy and spineless. Forewings with nearly rectangular apex.

== Species ==
The species of this genus are:

- Catephia abrostolica Hampson, 1926
- Catephia albifasciata (Pinhey, 1968)
- Catephia albirena Hampson, 1926
- Catephia albomacula (Draeseke, 1928)
- Catephia alchymista (Denis & Schiffermüller, 1775)
- Catephia barrettae Hampson, 1905
- Catephia cana (Brandt, 1939)
- Catephia compsotrephes Turner, 1932
- Catephia corticea Le Cerf, 1922
- Catephia cryptodisca Hampson, 1926
- Catephia dentifera (Moore, 1882)
- Catephia diphteroides (Moore, 1885)
- Catephia dipterygia Hampson, 1926
- Catephia discophora Hampson, 1926
- Catephia endoplaga Hampson, 1926
- Catephia eurymelas Hampson, 1916
- Catephia flavescens Butler, 1889
- Catephia holophaea Hampson, 1926
- Catephia iridocosma (Bethune-Baker, 1911)
- Catephia javensis Hampson, 1926
- Catephia lobata (Prout, 1928)
- Catephia melanica Hampson, 1926
- Catephia mesonephele Hampson, 1916
- Catephia metaleuca Hampson, 1926
- Catephia microcelis Hampson, 1926
- Catephia molybdocrosis Hampson, 1926
- Catephia nigrijuncta (Warren, 1914)
- Catephia nigropicta (Saalmüller, 1880)
- Catephia obscura (Wileman, 1914)
- Catephia oligomelas (Mabille, 1890)
- Catephia olivacea (Walker, 1863)
- Catephia pallididisca Hampson, 1926
- Catephia pericyma Hampson, 1916
- Catephia personata Walker, 1865
- Catephia philippinensis Wileman & West, 1929
- Catephia poliochroa Hampson, 1916
- Catephia pyramidalis Hampson, 1916
- Catephia sciachroa Hampson, 1926
- Catephia sciras Fawcett, 1916
- Catephia scotosa (Holland, 1894)
- Catephia scylla Fawcett, 1916
- Catephia serapis Fawcett, 1916
- Catephia shisa Strand, 1920
- Catephia sospita Fawcett, 1916
- Catephia squamosa Wallengren, 1856
- Catephia striata Hampson, 1902
- Catephia stygia Hampson, 1926
- Catephia thricophora Hampson, 1894
- Catephia triphaenoides Viette, 1965
- Catephia virescens Hampson, 1902
- Catephia xanthophaes (Bethune-Baker, 1911)
- Catephia xylois (Prout, 1925)

== Former species ==
- Catephia arctipennis Hulstaert, 1924
- Catephia canescens Hampson, 1926
- Catephia gravipes (Walker, 1858) (Nagia)
- Catephia linteola Guenée, 1852 (Nagia)
- Catephia melas (Bethune-Baker, 1906)
- Catephia pauli Holloway, 1976 (Ecpatia)
- Catephia perdicipennis (Moore, 1882)
- Catephia sthenistica (Hampson, 1926) (Nagia)
- Catephia susanae Holloway, 1976 (Ecpatia)
