= Javensis =

Javensis may refer to:

- Batrachostomus javensis, species of bird
- Catephia javensis, species of moth
- Coracina javensis, species of bird
- Dryocopus javensis, species of woodpecker
- Dryocopus javensis richardsi, subspecies of the white-bellied woodpecker
- Pingasa javensis, species of moth
- Psilopogon javensis, species of bird
- Sida javensis, species of plant
- Spathiostemon javensis, species of plant
- Streptomyces javensis, species of bacteria
- Trigonopterus javensis, species of flightless weevil
