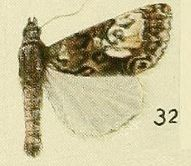

Scientific classification
- Kingdom: Animalia
- Phylum: Arthropoda
- Clade: Pancrustacea
- Class: Insecta
- Order: Lepidoptera
- Superfamily: Noctuoidea
- Family: Erebidae
- Genus: Catephia
- Species: C. sospita

Binomial name
- Catephia sospita Fawcett, 1916

Synonyms
- Aedia sospita (Fawcett, 1916)

= Catephia sospita =

Species of moth

Catephia sospita is a species of moth of the family Erebidae first described by James Farish Malcolm Fawcett in 1916. It is found in Kenya.
