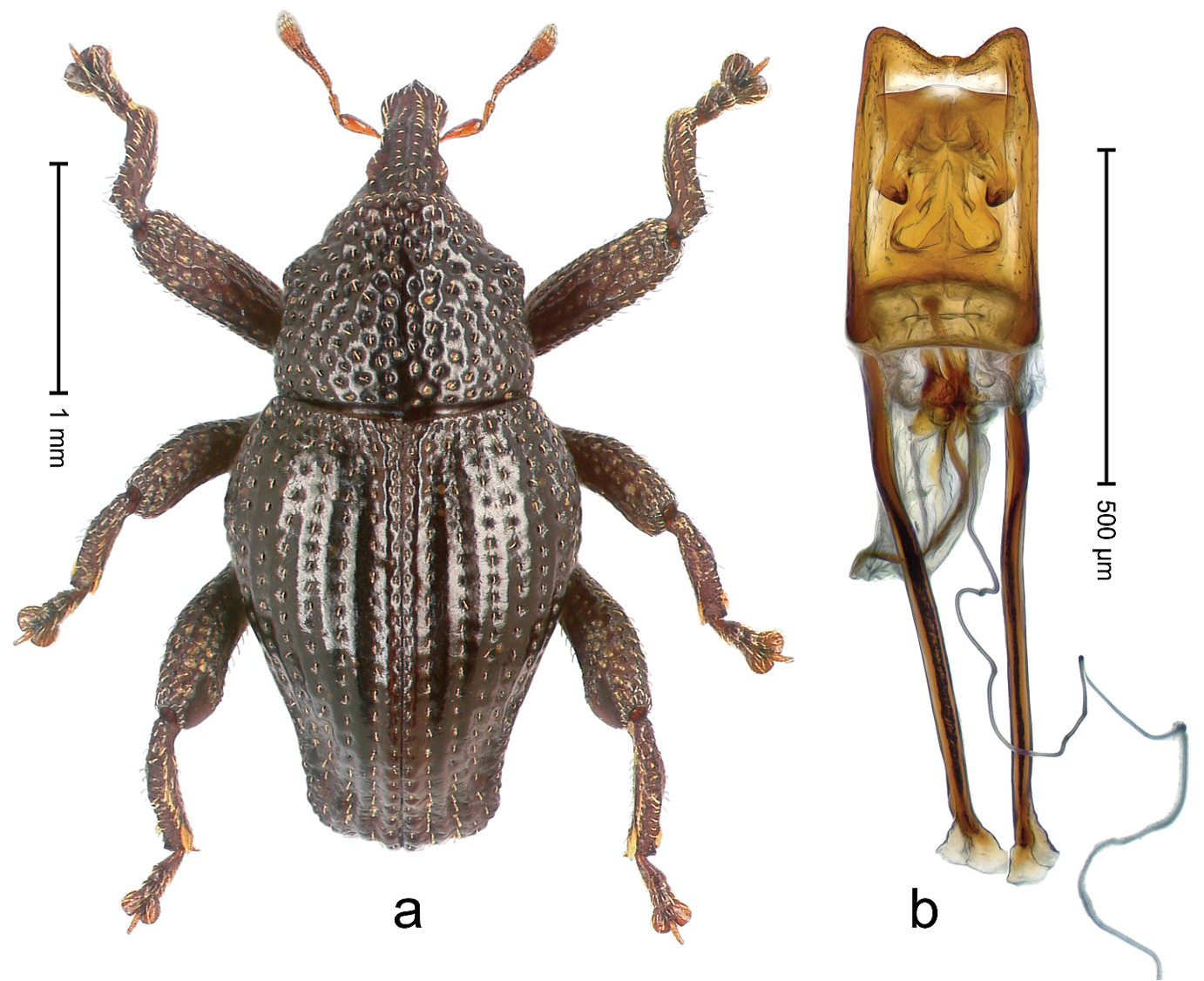
- Holotype specimen and penis

Scientific classification
- Kingdom: Animalia
- Phylum: Arthropoda
- Clade: Pancrustacea
- Class: Insecta
- Order: Coleoptera
- Suborder: Polyphaga
- Infraorder: Cucujiformia
- Family: Curculionidae
- Genus: Trigonopterus
- Species: T. pangandaranensis

Binomial name
- Trigonopterus pangandaranensis Riedel, 2014

= Trigonopterus pangandaranensis =

Species of beetle

Trigonopterus pangandaranensis is a species of flightless weevil in the genus Trigonopterus from Indonesia.

== Etymology ==
The specific name is derived from that of the type locality.

== Description ==
Individuals measure 2.65–2.98 mm in length. General coloration is black, with rust colored legs and head.

== Range ==
The species is found around elevations of 156–157 metres (512–515 ft) in Pangandaran, part of the Indonesian province of West Java.

== Phylogeny ==
T. pangandaranensis is part of the T. dimorphus species group.
