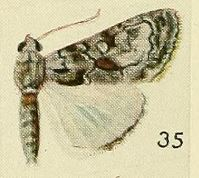
- Catephia sciras

Scientific classification
- Domain: Eukaryota
- Kingdom: Animalia
- Phylum: Arthropoda
- Class: Insecta
- Order: Lepidoptera
- Superfamily: Noctuoidea
- Family: Erebidae
- Genus: Catephia
- Species: C. sciras

Binomial name
- Catephia sciras Fawcett, 1916

= Catephia sciras =

Species of moth

Catephia sciras is a species of moth of the family Erebidae. It is found in eastern Africa in Kenya.
