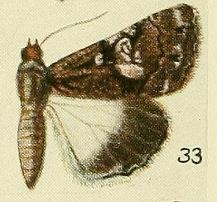

Scientific classification
- Domain: Eukaryota
- Kingdom: Animalia
- Phylum: Arthropoda
- Class: Insecta
- Order: Lepidoptera
- Superfamily: Noctuoidea
- Family: Erebidae
- Genus: Catephia
- Species: C. scylla

Binomial name
- Catephia scylla Fawcett, 1916

Synonyms
- Aedia scylla (Fawcett, 1916)

= Catephia scylla =

Species of moth

Catephia scylla is a species of moth of the family Erebidae first described by James Farish Malcolm Fawcett in 1916. It is found in Kenya.
