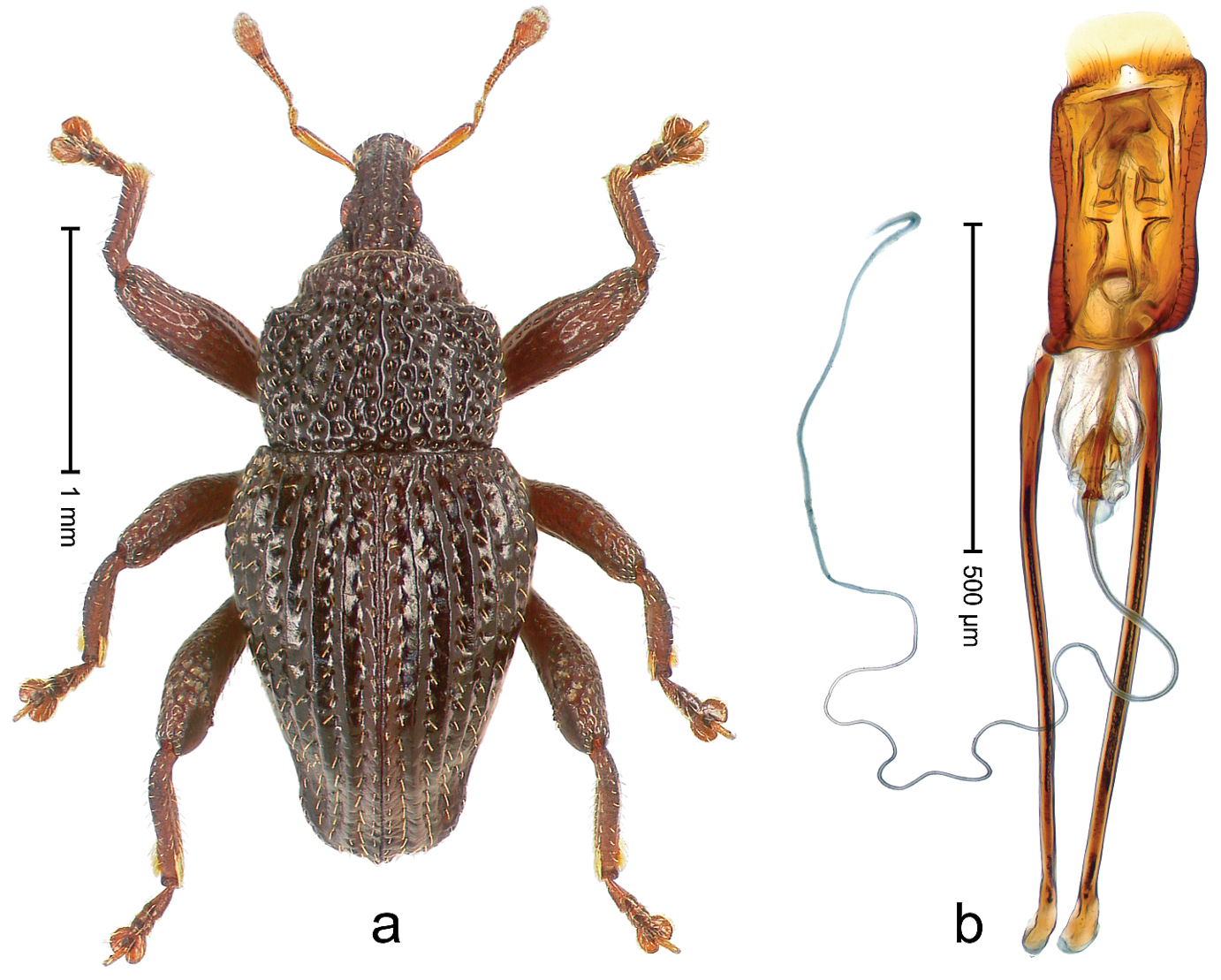
- Holotype specimen and penis

Scientific classification
- Kingdom: Animalia
- Phylum: Arthropoda
- Clade: Pancrustacea
- Class: Insecta
- Order: Coleoptera
- Suborder: Polyphaga
- Infraorder: Cucujiformia
- Family: Curculionidae
- Genus: Trigonopterus
- Species: T. porcatus

Binomial name
- Trigonopterus porcatus Riedel, 2014

= Trigonopterus porcatus =

Species of beetle

Trigonopterus porcatus is a species of flightless weevil in the genus Trigonopterus from Indonesia.

== Etymology ==
The specific name is derived from the Latin word porca, meaning "the ridge between two furrows". It refers to the texture of the elytra.

== Description ==
Individuals measure 2.15–2.63 mm in length. General coloration is black, with rust-colored legs and head.

== Range ==
The species is found around elevations of 1,085–1,563 metres (3,560–5,128 ft) on Mount Payung and Mount Cakrabuana in the Indonesian province of West Java.

== Phylogeny ==
T. porcatus is part of the T. dimorphus species group.
