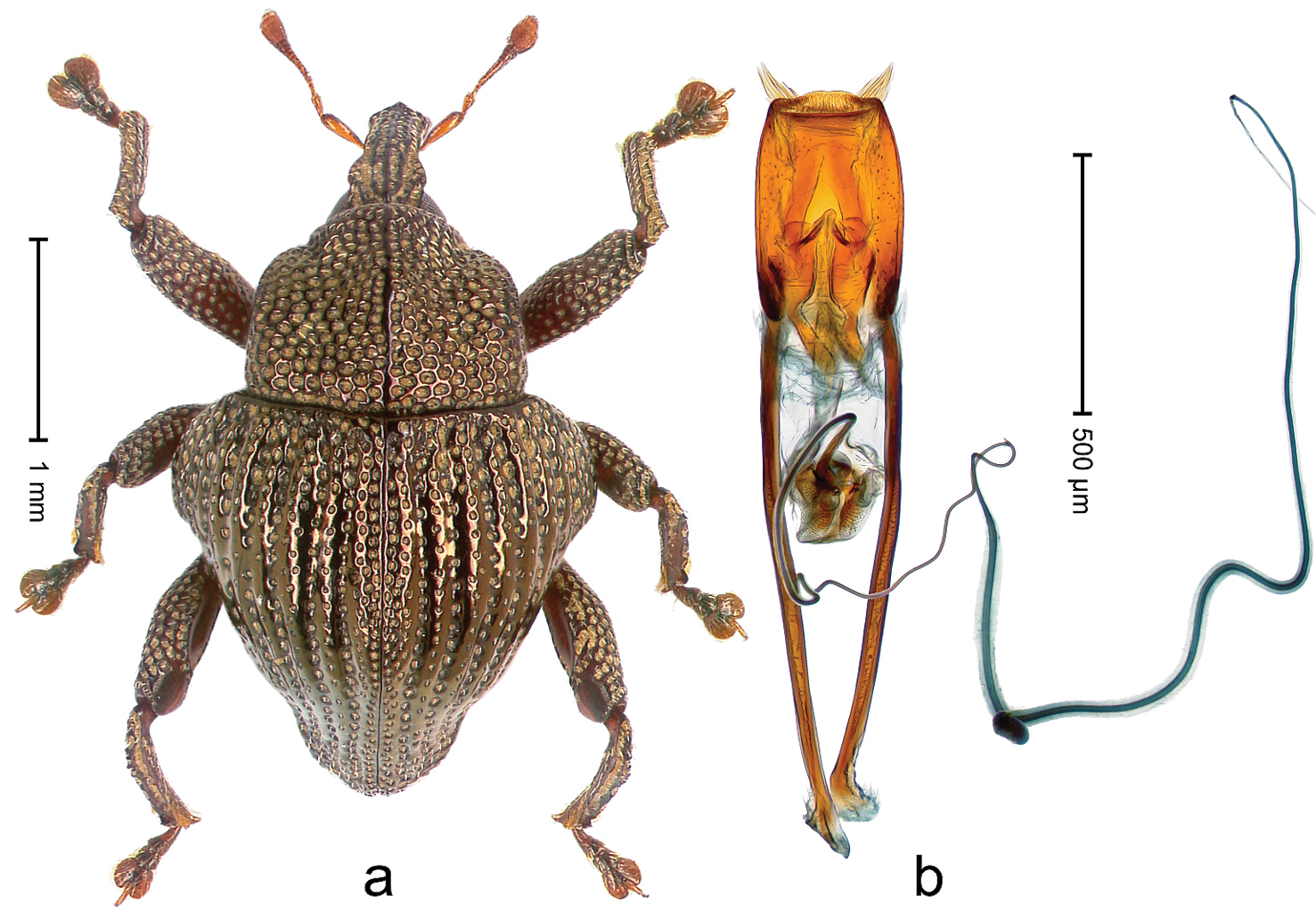
- Holotype specimen and penis

Scientific classification
- Kingdom: Animalia
- Phylum: Arthropoda
- Class: Insecta
- Order: Coleoptera
- Suborder: Polyphaga
- Infraorder: Cucujiformia
- Family: Curculionidae
- Genus: Trigonopterus
- Species: T. micans

Binomial name
- Trigonopterus micans Riedel, 2014

= Trigonopterus micans =

Species of beetle

Trigonopterus micans is a species of flightless weevil in the genus Trigonopterus from Indonesia.

== Etymology ==
The specific name is derived from the Latin word micans, meaning "shining". It refers to the species' metallic luster.

== Description ==
Individuals measure 2.20–2.97 mm in length. General coloration is dark rust-colored or black, with rust-colored legs and antennae and reddish-coppery coloration on the pronotum and elytra.

== Range ==
The species is found around elevations of 790–975 metres (2,592–3,199 ft) in Labuan Bajo on the island of Flores, part of the Indonesian province of East Nusa Tenggara.

== Phylogeny ==
T. micans is part of the T. dimorphus species group.
