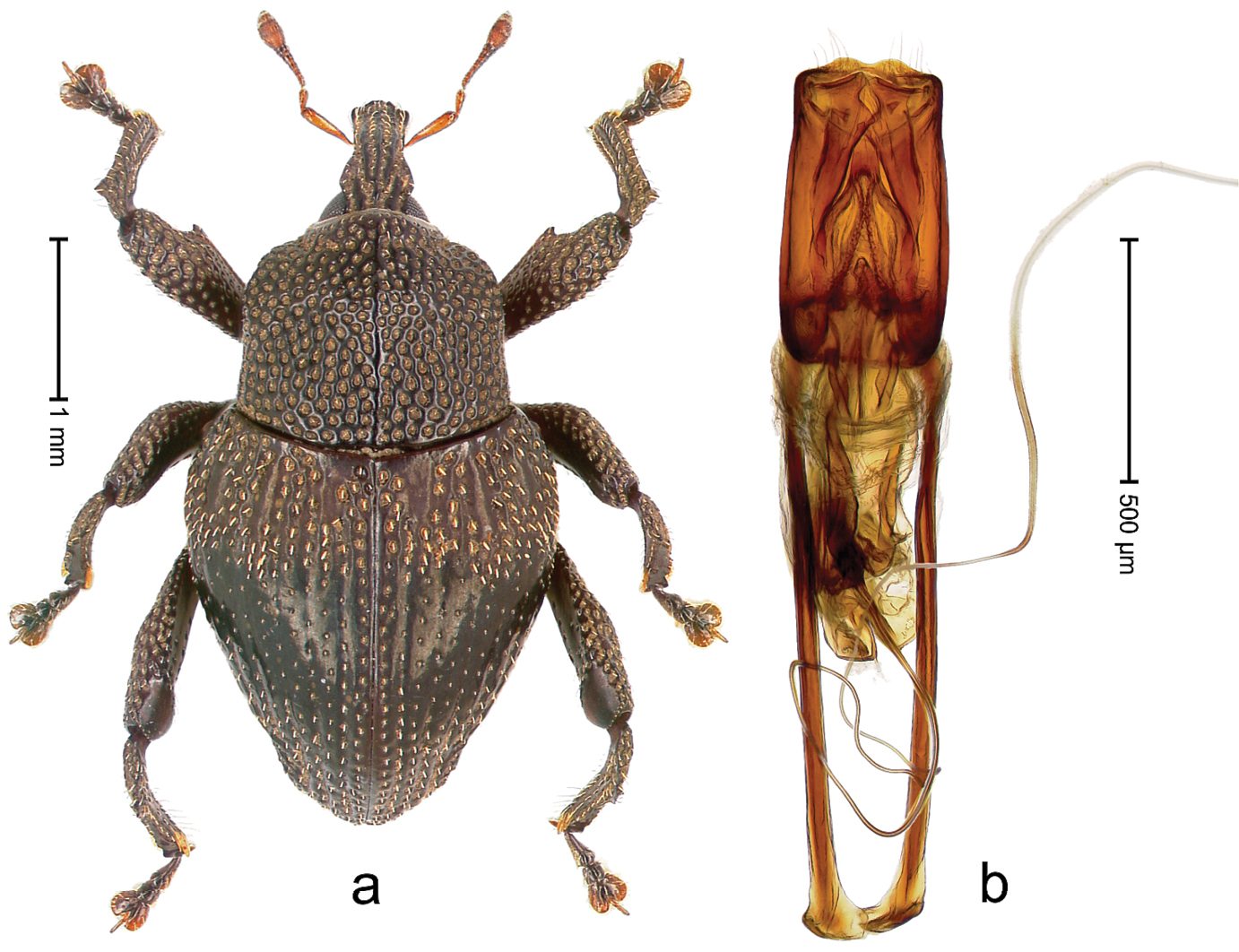

Scientific classification
- Kingdom: Animalia
- Phylum: Arthropoda
- Class: Insecta
- Order: Coleoptera
- Suborder: Polyphaga
- Infraorder: Cucujiformia
- Family: Curculionidae
- Genus: Trigonopterus
- Species: T. dentipes

Binomial name
- Trigonopterus dentipes Riedel, 2014

= Trigonopterus dentipes =

Species of beetle

Trigonopterus dentipes is a species of flightless weevil in the genus Trigonopterus from Indonesia.

== Etymology ==
The specific name is derived from the Latin words dens, meaning "tooth", and pes, meaning "foot".

== Description ==
Individuals measure 3.04–4.04 mm in length. The elytra in females are slenderer than in males. General coloration is black, with rust-colored antennae and dark-rust color on the legs and the basal third of the elytra. The rust-colored portion of the elytra can range from orange-ish to essentially black.

== Range ==
The species is found around elevations of 830–1,240 metres (2,720–4,070 ft) in Santong, Senaru, and Tetebatu on the island of Lombok, part of the Indonesian province of West Nusa Tenggara.

== Phylogeny ==
T. dentipes is part of the T. dimorphus species group.
