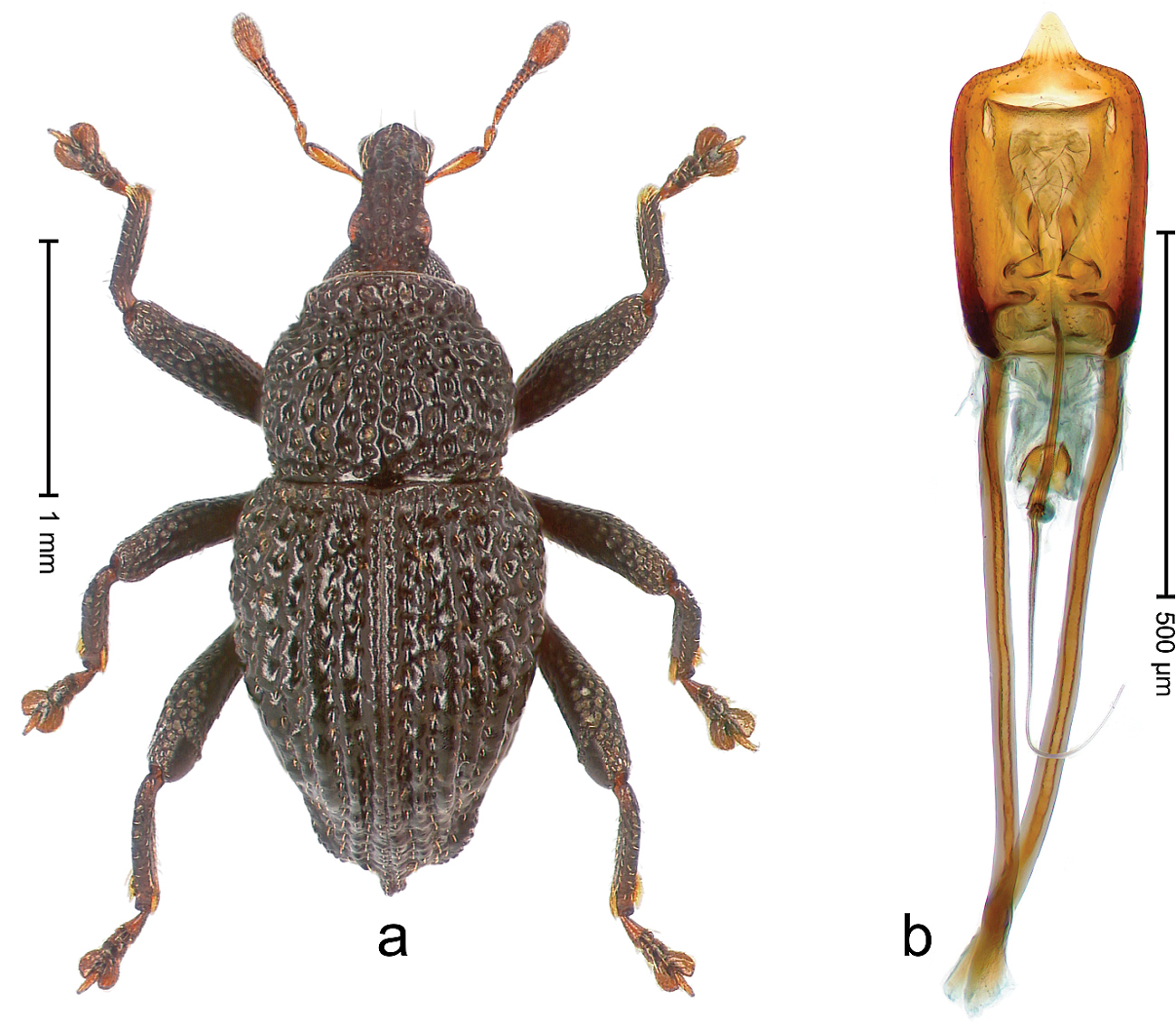

Scientific classification
- Kingdom: Animalia
- Phylum: Arthropoda
- Clade: Pancrustacea
- Class: Insecta
- Order: Coleoptera
- Suborder: Polyphaga
- Infraorder: Cucujiformia
- Family: Curculionidae
- Genus: Trigonopterus
- Species: T. gedensis

Binomial name
- Trigonopterus gedensis Riedel, 2014

= Trigonopterus gedensis =

Species of beetle

Trigonopterus gedensis is a species of flightless weevil in the genus Trigonopterus from Indonesia.

== Etymology ==
The specific name is derived from that of the type locality.

== Description ==
Individuals measure 2.30–2.55 mm in length. General coloration is black, with rust colored tarsi and antennae.

== Range ==
The species is found around elevations of 1,940–2,117 metres (6,365–6,946 ft) on Mount Gede in the Indonesian province of West Java.

== Phylogeny ==
T. gedensis is part of the T. dimorphus species group.
