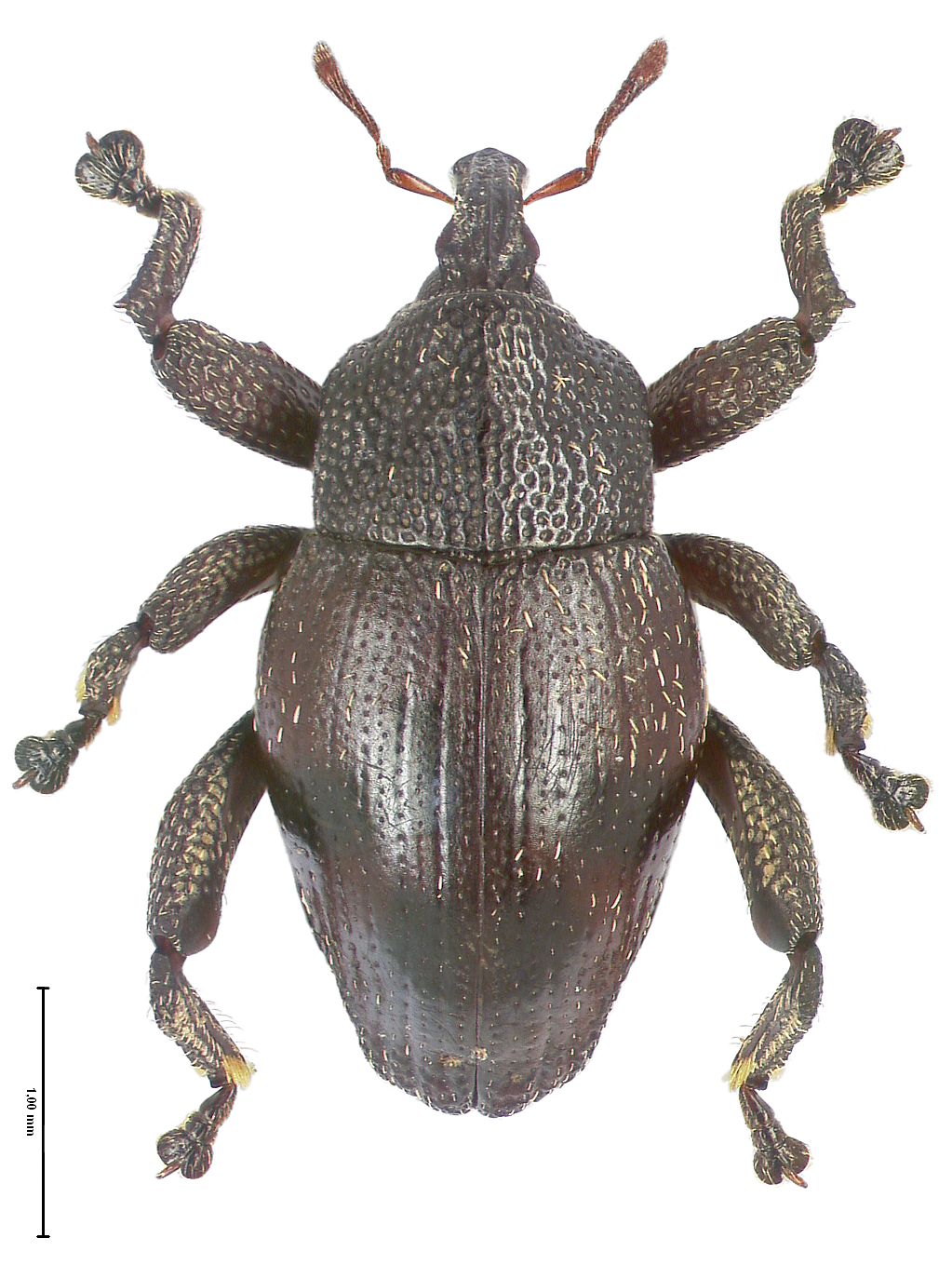

Scientific classification
- Kingdom: Animalia
- Phylum: Arthropoda
- Clade: Pancrustacea
- Class: Insecta
- Order: Coleoptera
- Suborder: Polyphaga
- Infraorder: Cucujiformia
- Family: Curculionidae
- Genus: Trigonopterus
- Species: T. merubetirensis

Binomial name
- Trigonopterus merubetirensis Riedel, 2014

= Trigonopterus merubetirensis =

Species of beetle

Trigonopterus merubetirensis is a species of flightless weevil in the genus Trigonopterus from Indonesia.

== Etymology ==
The specific name is derived from that of the type locality.

== Description ==
Individuals measure 2.88–3.31 mm in length. General coloration is black, except for the legs and head, which are rust-colored, and the elytra, which are dark rust colored with a faint black stripe running transversely across the middle and a blacks spot at the apex.

== Range ==
The species is found around elevations of 260–340 metres (850–1,120 ft) in Meru Betiri National Park, part of the Indonesian province of East Java.

== Phylogeny ==
T. merubetirensis is part of the T. dimorphus species group.
