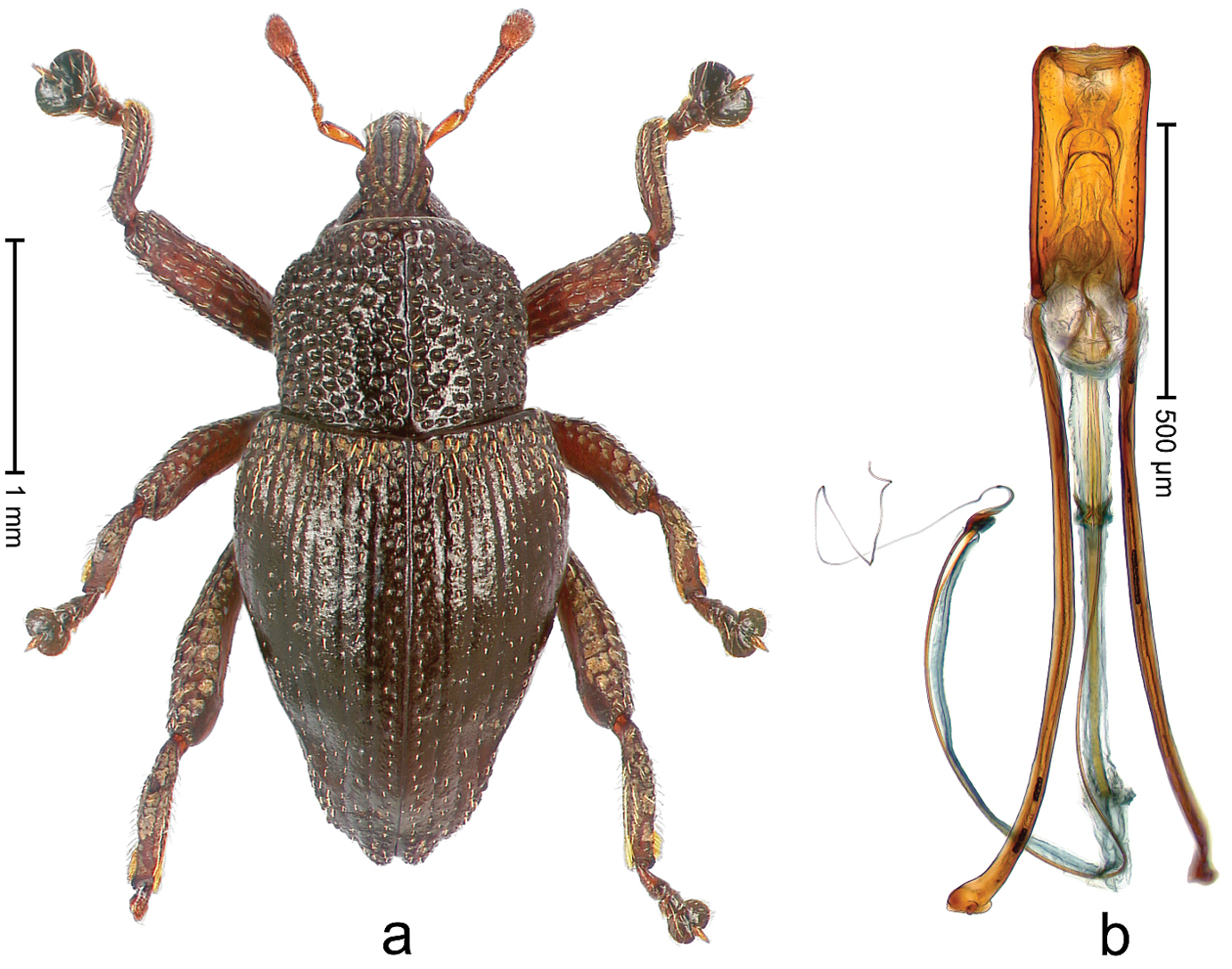
- Holotype specimen and penis

Scientific classification
- Kingdom: Animalia
- Phylum: Arthropoda
- Clade: Pancrustacea
- Class: Insecta
- Order: Coleoptera
- Suborder: Polyphaga
- Infraorder: Cucujiformia
- Family: Curculionidae
- Genus: Trigonopterus
- Species: T. latipes

Binomial name
- Trigonopterus latipes Riedel, 2014

= Trigonopterus latipes =

Species of beetle

Trigonopterus latipes is a species of flightless weevil in the genus Trigonopterus from Indonesia.

== Etymology ==
The specific name is derived from the Latin words latus, meaning "wide", and pes, meaning "foot". It refers to the size of the protarsi.

== Description ==
Individuals measure 2.86–3.03 mm in length. General coloration is black, with rust-colored legs and antennae. The protarsi are also black.

== Range ==
The species is found around elevations of 1,430 metres (4,690 ft) on Mount Semeru in the Indonesian province of East Java.

== Phylogeny ==
T. latipes is part of the T. dimorphus species group.
