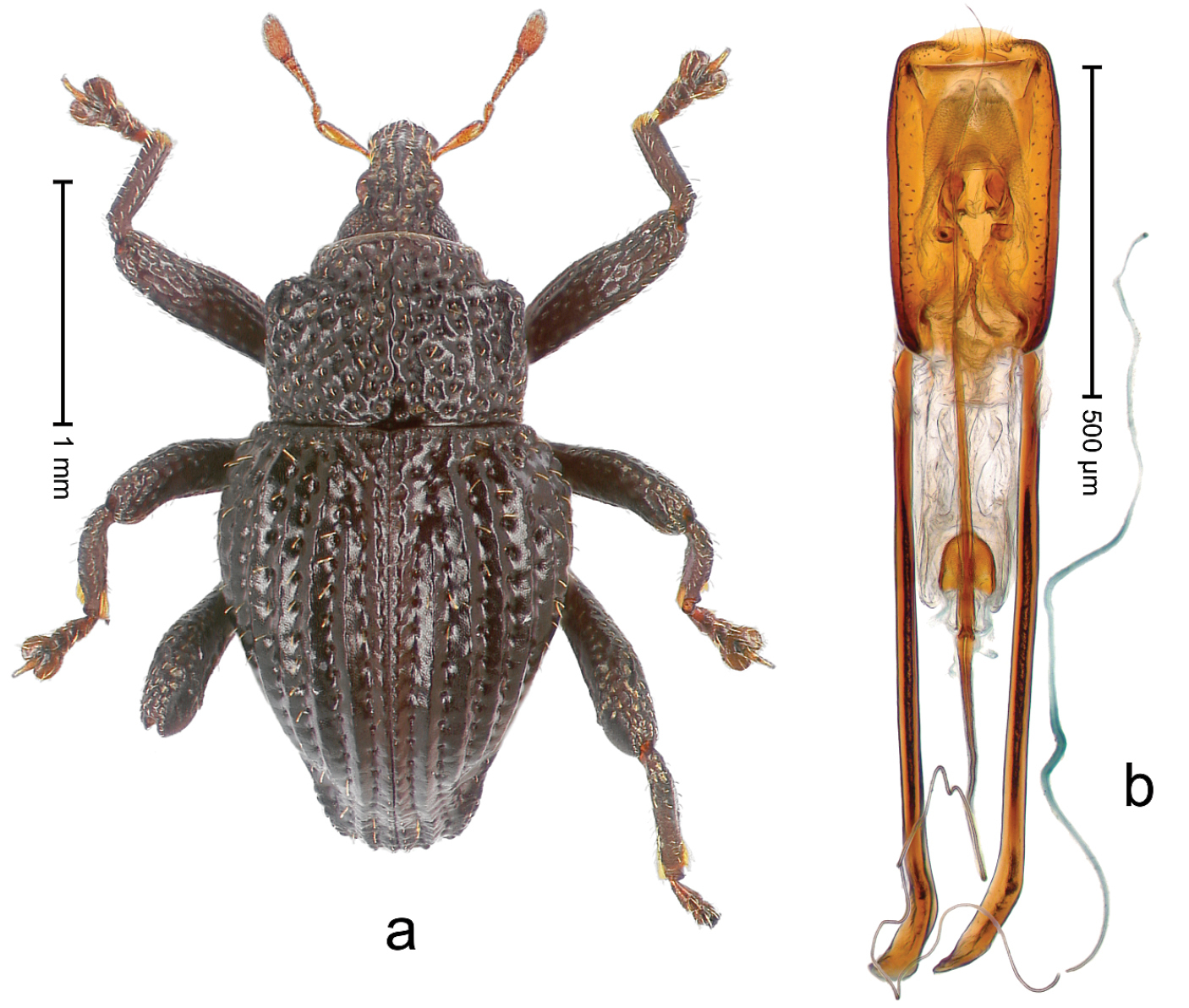
- Holotype specimen and penis

Scientific classification
- Kingdom: Animalia
- Phylum: Arthropoda
- Clade: Pancrustacea
- Class: Insecta
- Order: Coleoptera
- Suborder: Polyphaga
- Infraorder: Cucujiformia
- Family: Curculionidae
- Genus: Trigonopterus
- Species: T. payungensis

Binomial name
- Trigonopterus payungensis Riedel, 2014

= Trigonopterus payungensis =

Species of beetle

Trigonopterus payungensis is a species of flightless weevil in the genus Trigonopterus from Indonesia.

== Etymology ==
The specific name is derived from that of the type locality.

== Description ==
Individuals measure 2.40–2.58 mm (0.094–0.102 in) in length. Body is slightly hexagonal in shape. General coloration is black, with rust-colored tibiae, tarsi, and antennae.

== Range ==
The species is found around elevations of 1,085–1,250 metres (3,560–4,101 ft) on Mount Payung in the Indonesian province of West Java.

== Phylogeny ==
T. payungensis is part of the T. dimorphus species group.
