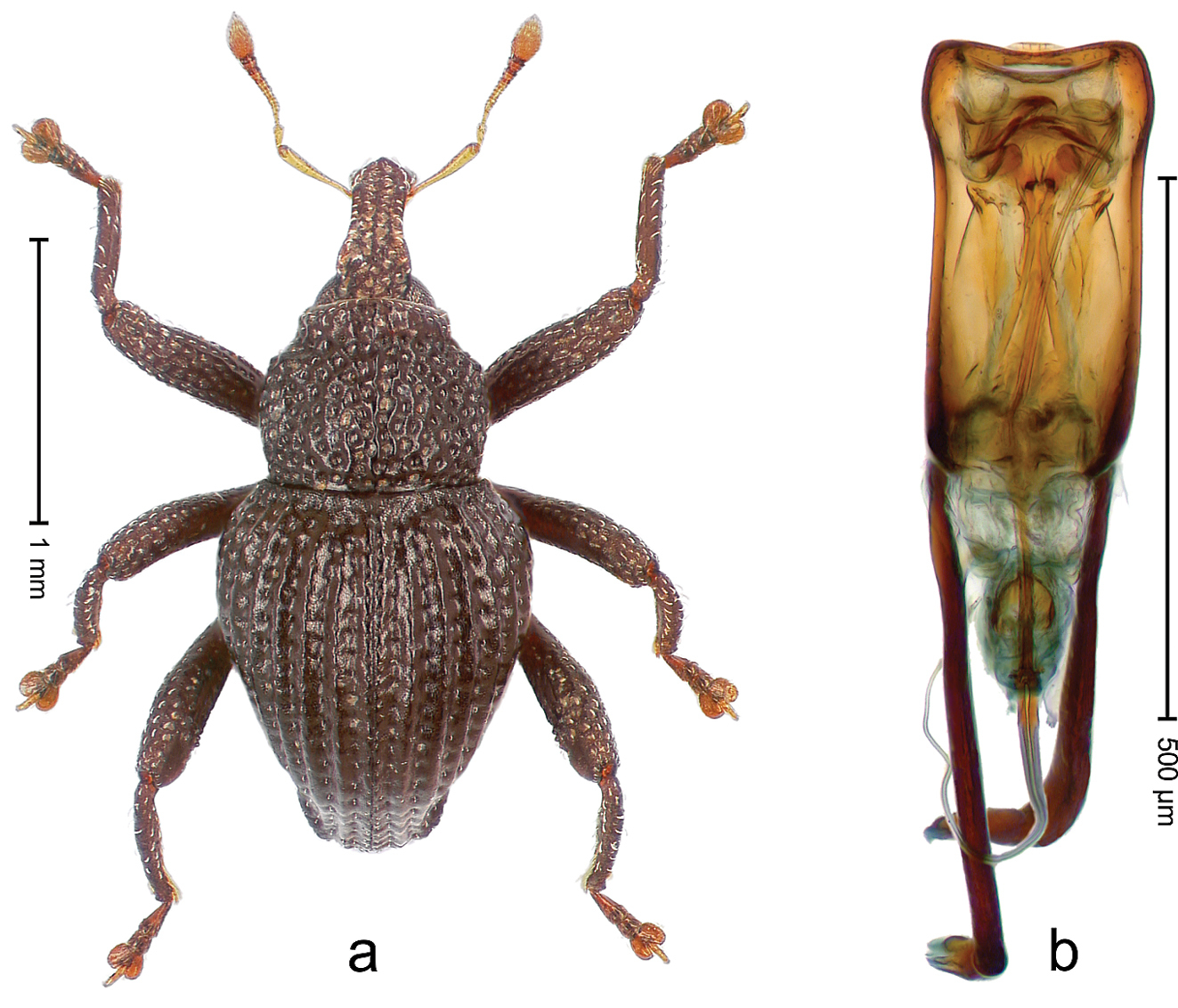
- Holotype specimen and penis

Scientific classification
- Kingdom: Animalia
- Phylum: Arthropoda
- Clade: Pancrustacea
- Class: Insecta
- Order: Coleoptera
- Suborder: Polyphaga
- Infraorder: Cucujiformia
- Family: Curculionidae
- Genus: Trigonopterus
- Species: T. lampungensis

Binomial name
- Trigonopterus lampungensis Riedel, 2014

= Trigonopterus lampungensis =

Species of beetle

Trigonopterus lampungensis is a species of flightless weevil in the genus Trigonopterus from Indonesia.

== Etymology ==
The specific name is derived from that of the Indonesian province of Lampung.

== Description ==
Individuals measure 1.96–2.40 mm in length. General coloration is a dark rust-color ranging to black, with light rust-colored antennae.

== Range ==
The species is found around elevations of 421–813 metres (1,381–2,667 ft) in Bukit Barisan Selatan National Park and around Pedada Bay, in the Indonesian province of Lampung.

== Phylogeny ==
T. lampungensis is part of the T. dimorphus species group.
