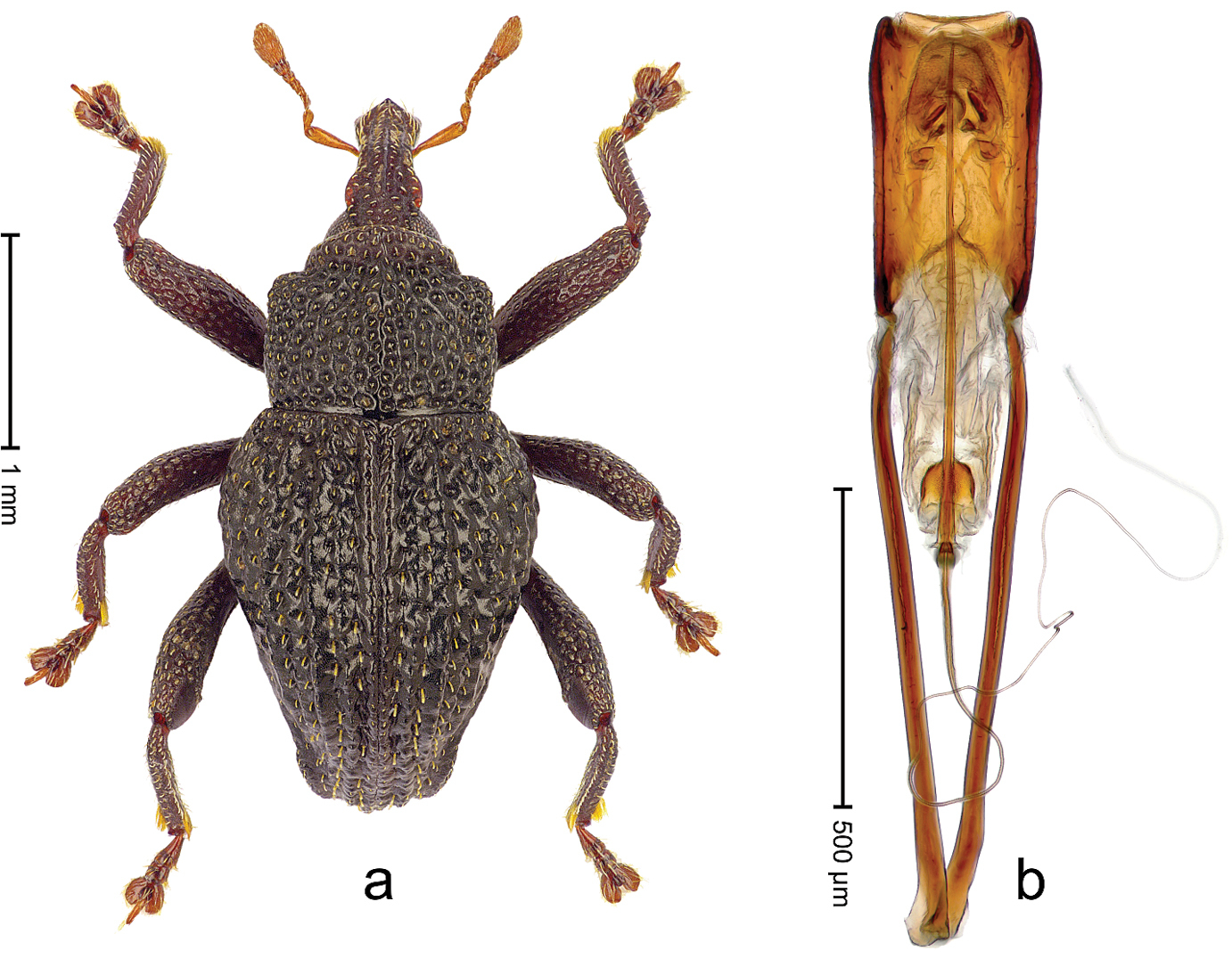

Scientific classification
- Kingdom: Animalia
- Phylum: Arthropoda
- Clade: Pancrustacea
- Class: Insecta
- Order: Coleoptera
- Suborder: Polyphaga
- Infraorder: Cucujiformia
- Family: Curculionidae
- Genus: Trigonopterus
- Species: T. duabelas

Binomial name
- Trigonopterus duabelas Riedel, 2014

= Trigonopterus duabelas =

Species of beetle

Trigonopterus duabelas is a species of flightless weevil in the genus Trigonopterus from Indonesia.

== Etymology ==
The specific name is derived from the Indonesian word for "twelve".

== Description ==
Individuals measure 2.2–2.8 mm in length. General coloration is black, with rust-colored tarsi and antennae. The entire legs are rust-colored in the Mount Slamet population.

== Range ==
The species is found around elevations of 1,505–1,858 metres (4,938–6,096 ft) on the Dieng Plateau and Mount Slapet in the Indonesian province of Central Java.

== Phylogeny ==
T. duabelas is part of the T. dimorphus species group.
