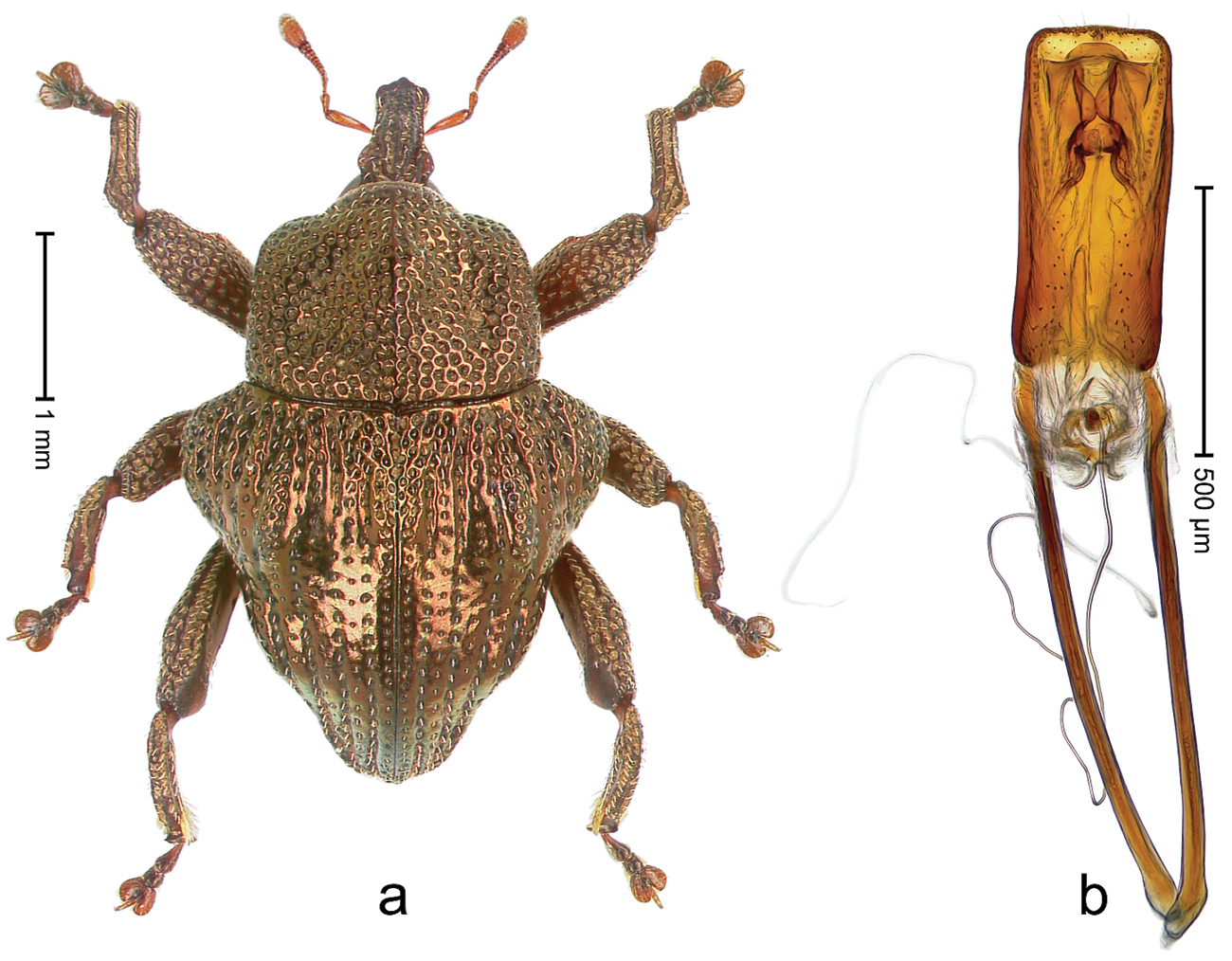

Scientific classification
- Kingdom: Animalia
- Phylum: Arthropoda
- Class: Insecta
- Order: Coleoptera
- Suborder: Polyphaga
- Infraorder: Cucujiformia
- Family: Curculionidae
- Genus: Trigonopterus
- Species: T. fulgidus

Binomial name
- Trigonopterus fulgidus Riedel, 2014

= Trigonopterus fulgidus =

Species of beetle

Trigonopterus fulgidus is a species of flightless weevil in the genus Trigonopterus from Indonesia.

== Etymology ==
The specific name is derived from the Latin word fulgidus, meaning "shining" or "gleaming".

== Description ==
Individuals measure 2.38–3.78 mm in length. The legs, head, and underside are rust-colored, with a reddish- or greenish-copper colored pronotum and elytra.

== Range ==
The species is found around elevations of 830–1,240 metres (2,720–4,070 ft) in Santong, Sembalun, and Senaru on the island of Lombok, part of the Indonesian province of West Nusa Tenggara.

== Phylogeny ==
T. fulgidus is part of the T. dimorphus species group.
