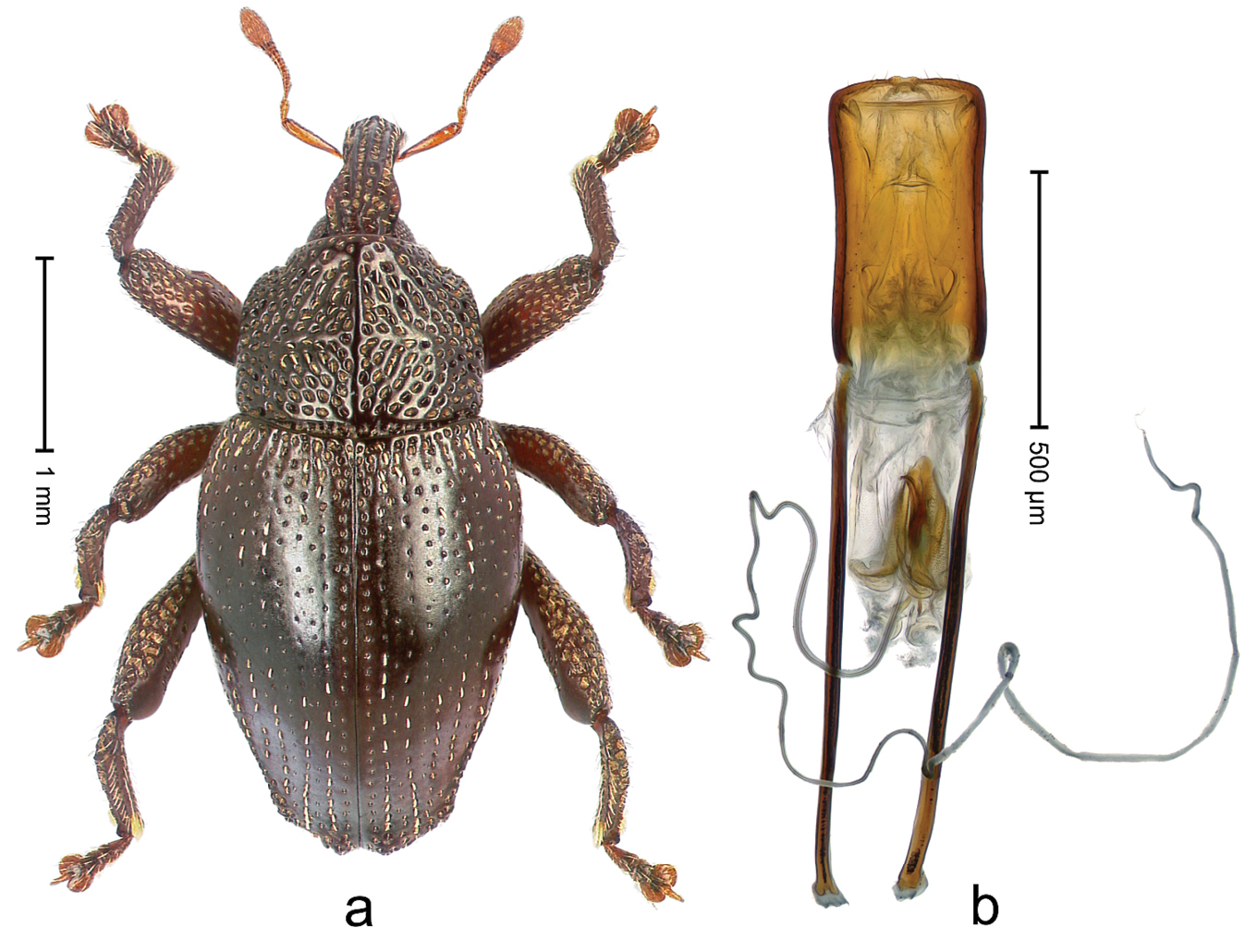

Scientific classification
- Kingdom: Animalia
- Phylum: Arthropoda
- Clade: Pancrustacea
- Class: Insecta
- Order: Coleoptera
- Suborder: Polyphaga
- Infraorder: Cucujiformia
- Family: Curculionidae
- Genus: Trigonopterus
- Species: T. ijensis

Binomial name
- Trigonopterus ijensis Riedel, 2014

= Trigonopterus ijensis =

Species of beetle

Trigonopterus ijensis is a species of flightless weevil in the genus Trigonopterus from Indonesia.

== Etymology ==
The specific name is derived from that of the type locality.

== Description ==
Individuals measure 2.75–3.31 mm in length. General coloration is black, with rust-colored legs and head. The elytra are dark rust-colored, with a black band running transversely across them.

== Range ==
The species is found around elevations of 1,225–1,575 metres (4,019–5,167 ft) on Mount Ijen, in the Indonesian province of East Java.

== Phylogeny ==
T. ijensis is part of the T. dimorphus species group.
