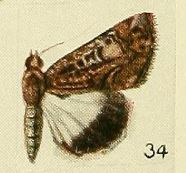
- Catephia serapis

Scientific classification
- Kingdom: Animalia
- Phylum: Arthropoda
- Class: Insecta
- Order: Lepidoptera
- Superfamily: Noctuoidea
- Family: Erebidae
- Genus: Catephia
- Species: C. serapis

Binomial name
- Catephia serapis Fawcett, 1916

= Catephia serapis =

Species of moth

Catephia serapis is a species of moth of the family Erebidae. It is found in eastern Africa in Kenya.
