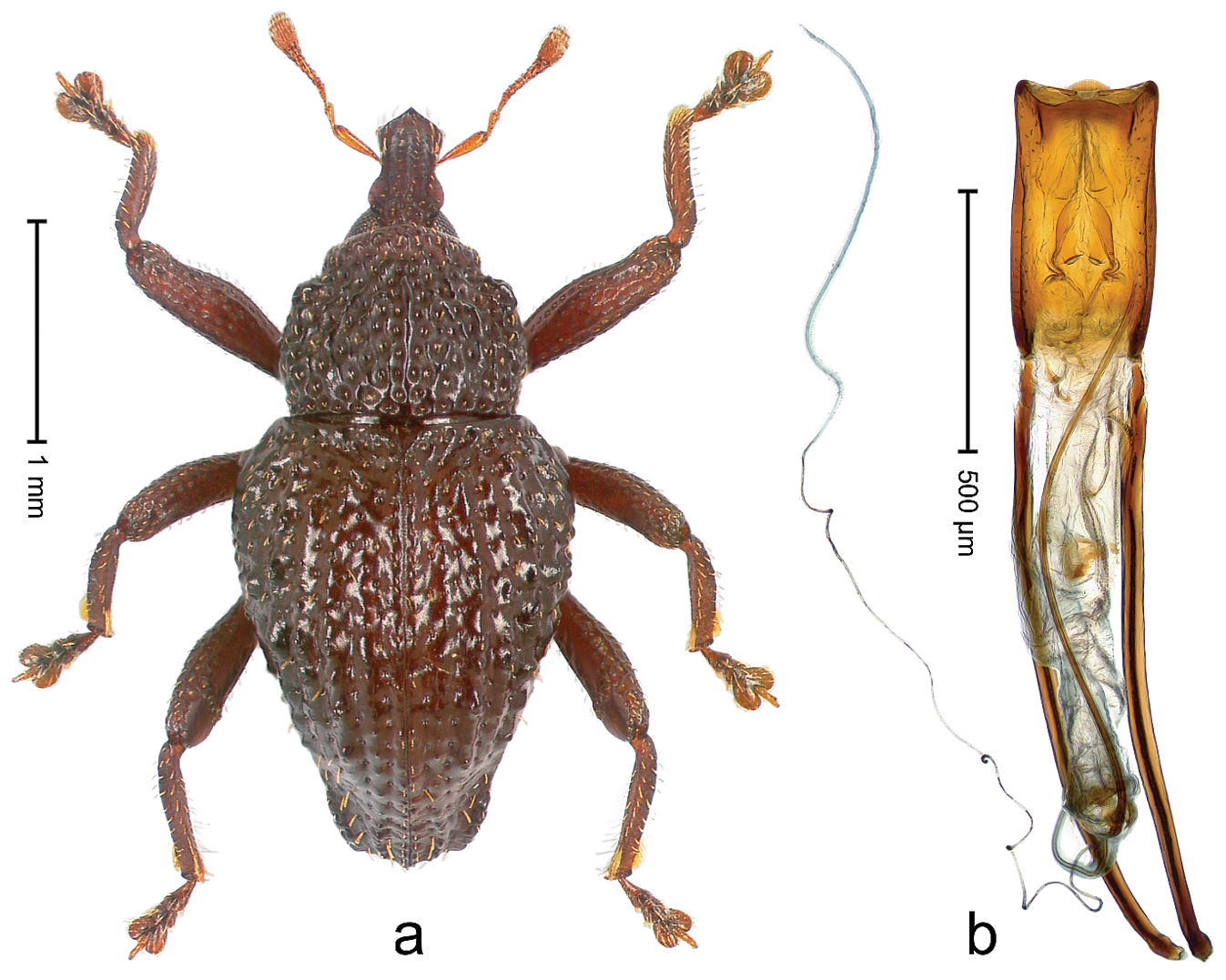

Scientific classification
- Kingdom: Animalia
- Phylum: Arthropoda
- Clade: Pancrustacea
- Class: Insecta
- Order: Coleoptera
- Suborder: Polyphaga
- Infraorder: Cucujiformia
- Family: Curculionidae
- Genus: Trigonopterus
- Species: T. halimunensis

Binomial name
- Trigonopterus halimunensis Riedel, 2014

= Trigonopterus halimunensis =

Species of beetle

Trigonopterus halimunensis is a species of flightless weevil in the genus Trigonopterus from Indonesia.

== Information ==
The specific name is derived from that of the type locality Individuals measure 2.53–3.00 mm in length. The general coloration is black, with a rust-colored head, antennae, legs, and part of the elytra. The body is elongated, with a noticeable constriction between the pronotum and the elytra in the dorsal view, and a distinct constriction in profile. The rostrum is short and does not reach the middle of the middle coxae when at rest. The elytra have 9 grooves, and the claws of the legs are small. This species was previously referred to as "Trigonopterus sp. 299." The species is found around elevations of 1,429–1,756 metres (4,688–5,761 ft) in Mount Halimun Salak National Park in the Indonesian province of West Java. The species T. halimunensis is part of the T. dimorphus species group.

=== Taxonomy ===
The species was first described in 2014 by German coleopterist Alexander Riedel (Museum of Natural History Karlsruhe, Karlsruhe, Germany), along with entomologists Rene Tänzler (Zoological State Collection, Munich), Michael Balke (GeoBioCenter, LMU Munich, Munich, Germany), Cahyo Rahmadi (Indonesian Institute of Sciences, Research Center for Biology, Cibinong, West Java, Indonesia), and Yayuk R. Suhardjono (Zoological Museum, Cibinong Science Center — LIPI, Jl. Raya Jakarta-Bogor, Indonesia). They conducted a revision of the fauna of the genus Trigonopterus on the island of Java and neighboring islands.
