= Nagia homotona =

Scientific classification
- Domain: Eukaryota
- Kingdom: Animalia
- Phylum: Arthropoda
- Class: Insecta
- Order: Lepidoptera
- Superfamily: Noctuoidea
- Family: Erebidae
- Genus: Nagia
- Species: N. homotona

Binomial name
- Nagia homotona Hampson, 1926

Synonyms
- Catephia homotona

Species of moth

Nagia homotona is a species of moth in the family Erebidae. It is found in Ghana.
