= Catephia flavescens =

Scientific classification
- Domain: Eukaryota
- Kingdom: Animalia
- Phylum: Arthropoda
- Class: Insecta
- Order: Lepidoptera
- Superfamily: Noctuoidea
- Family: Erebidae
- Genus: Catephia
- Species: C. flavescens

Binomial name
- Catephia flavescens Butler, 1889

Species of moth

Catephia flavescens is a species of moth of the family Erebidae. It is found in India (Sikkim).

The wingspan is about 38 mm. The forewings are ochreous with subbasal, antemedial, medial and submarginal waved lines. There are dark patches on the costa at the centre and at the apex. The inner area is blackish, with some blue scales near the outer angle. The hindwings are yellowish, with a black-brown outer area.
