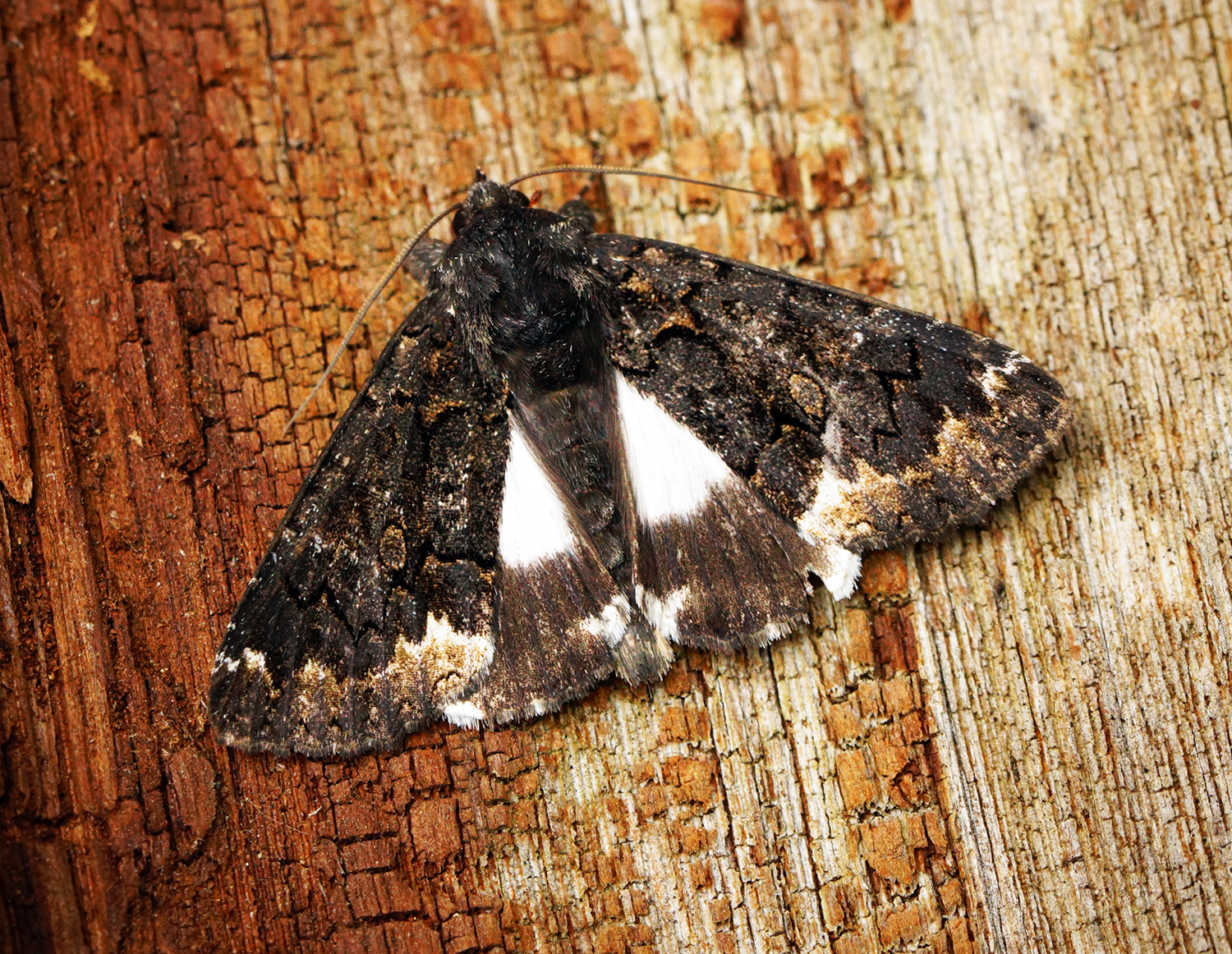

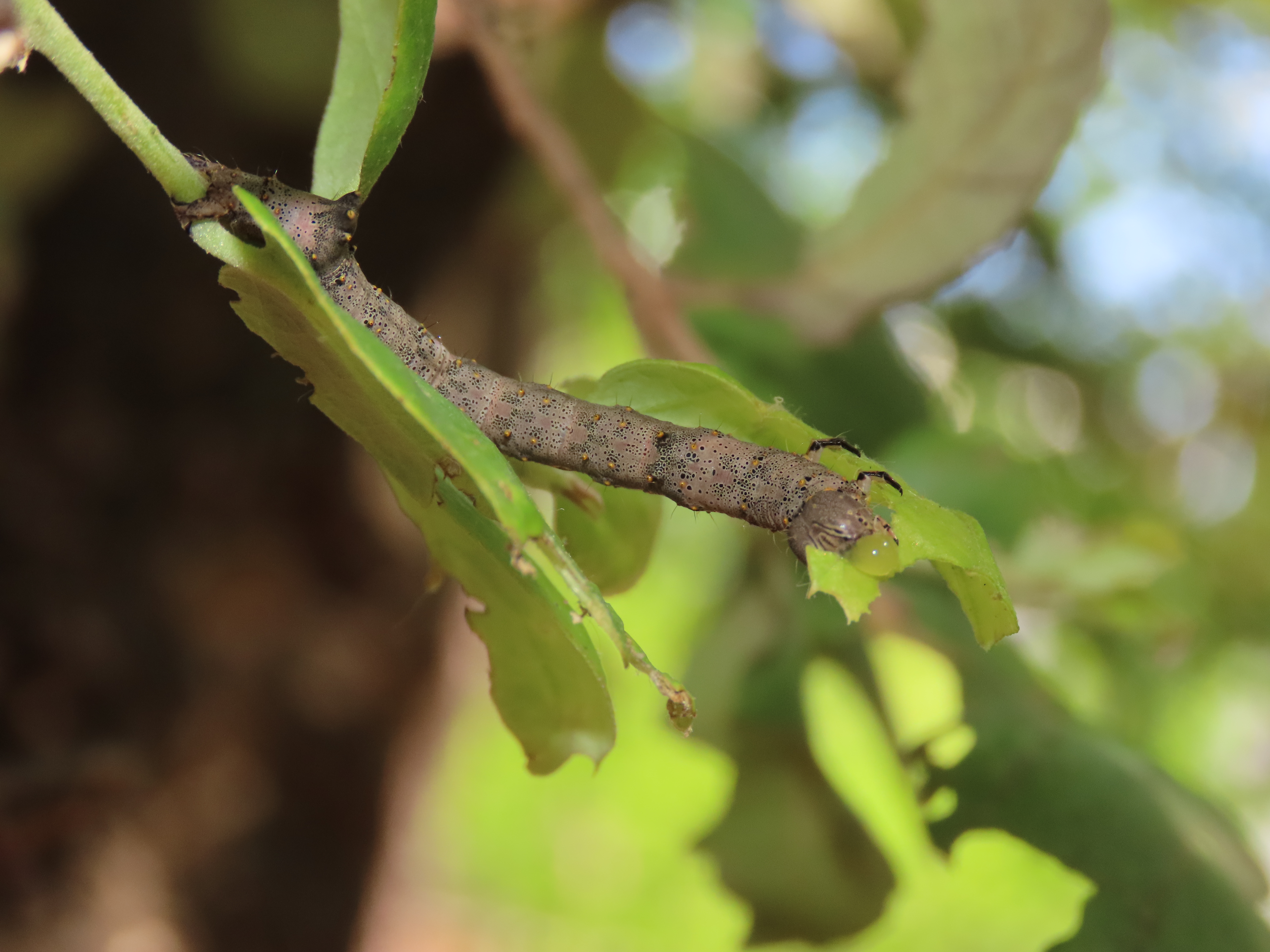
- Larva of C. alchymista feeding on Cork Oak (Quercus suber)

Scientific classification
- Kingdom: Animalia
- Phylum: Arthropoda
- Class: Insecta
- Order: Lepidoptera
- Superfamily: Noctuoidea
- Family: Erebidae
- Genus: Catephia
- Species: C. alchymista

Binomial name
- Catephia alchymista (Denis & Schiffermüller, 1775)

Synonyms
- Noctua alchymista Denis & Schiffermuller, 1775; Catephia uniformis Bang-Haas, 1910

= Catephia alchymista =

White underwing

Species of moth

Catephia alchymista, the white underwing or alchymist, is a moth in the family Erebidae found in Asia, Europe and North Africa. The species was first described by Michael Denis and Ignaz Schiffermüller in 1775.

== Technical description and variation ==
C. alchymista Schiff. Forewing ash-black; lines deep black; inner and outer irregularly dentate, partially brown-edged externally; subterminal line light brown, irregular and dilated in places, at costa marked with white; stigmata with deep black edges; hindwing white in basal half, except along inner margin, which like outer half is blackish; terminal spots white, running out into the fringe, at apex and above anal angle. Larva reddish brown, marbled with black and whitish; dorsal tubercles black; head brown; segment 2 yellow in front the ab. varia Chr., from Sarepta, has greenish grey forewings with very strongly marked black lines. The wingspan is 35–45 millimetres (1.4–1.8 in).

== Biology ==
The moths are on wing from May to July, and in southern Europe there is a partial second generation in August and September. The larvae feed on oak (Quercus species), preferring new growth and saplings and have also been found on elm (Ulmus species). Pupation takes place, through the winter, in a cocoon on the ground.

== Distribution ==
It is found in southern and central Europe up to the Caucasus. In the north, the range extends to Latvia and Lithuania. In the east, the range extends through southern Russia to the Urals. It also occurs on the larger Mediterranean islands (including Cyprus), in North Africa and Israel and Asia Minor. Sometimes it is observed in England as a migrant. In the Alps it rises to 800 meters. The moth is found in areas with oak trees, such as oak and mixed forests, alluvial forests, bushy heaths and parklands.
