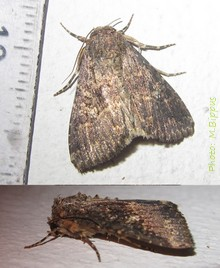
- Catephia squamosa

Scientific classification
- Kingdom: Animalia
- Phylum: Arthropoda
- Clade: Pancrustacea
- Class: Insecta
- Order: Lepidoptera
- Superfamily: Noctuoidea
- Family: Erebidae
- Genus: Catephia
- Species: C. squamosa

Binomial name
- Catephia squamosa (Wallengren, 1856)

Synonyms
- Anophia discistriga Walker, 1858; Plusia inconclusa Walker, 1858; Anophia trispilosa Saalmüller, 1880

= Catephia squamosa =

Scaly alchemyst

Species of moth

Catephia squamosa, the scaly alchemyst, is a species of moth in the family Erebidae. The species is found in central, eastern and southern Africa, including some islands of the Indian Ocean.

It has a wingspan of approx. 32 mm.
