= Catephia albomacula =

Scientific classification
- Domain: Eukaryota
- Kingdom: Animalia
- Phylum: Arthropoda
- Class: Insecta
- Order: Lepidoptera
- Superfamily: Noctuoidea
- Family: Erebidae
- Genus: Catephia
- Species: C. albomacula

Binomial name
- Catephia albomacula (Draeseke, 1928)

Synonyms
- Anophia albomacula Draeseke, 1928; Anophia albomacula f. privata Draudt, 1950

Species of moth

Catephia albomacula is a species of moth of the family Erebidae. It is found in China.
