= Catephia triphaenoides =

Scientific classification
- Kingdom: Animalia
- Phylum: Arthropoda
- Class: Insecta
- Order: Lepidoptera
- Superfamily: Noctuoidea
- Family: Erebidae
- Genus: Catephia
- Species: C. triphaenoides

Binomial name
- Catephia triphaenoides Viette, 1965

Species of moth

Catephia triphaenoides is a species of moth of the family Erebidae. It is found in Madagascar.
