= Catephia striata =

Scientific classification
- Kingdom: Animalia
- Phylum: Arthropoda
- Class: Insecta
- Order: Lepidoptera
- Superfamily: Noctuoidea
- Family: Erebidae
- Genus: Catephia
- Species: C. striata

Binomial name
- Catephia striata Hampson, 1902

Species of moth

Catephia striata is a species of moth of the family Erebidae. It is found in South Africa.
