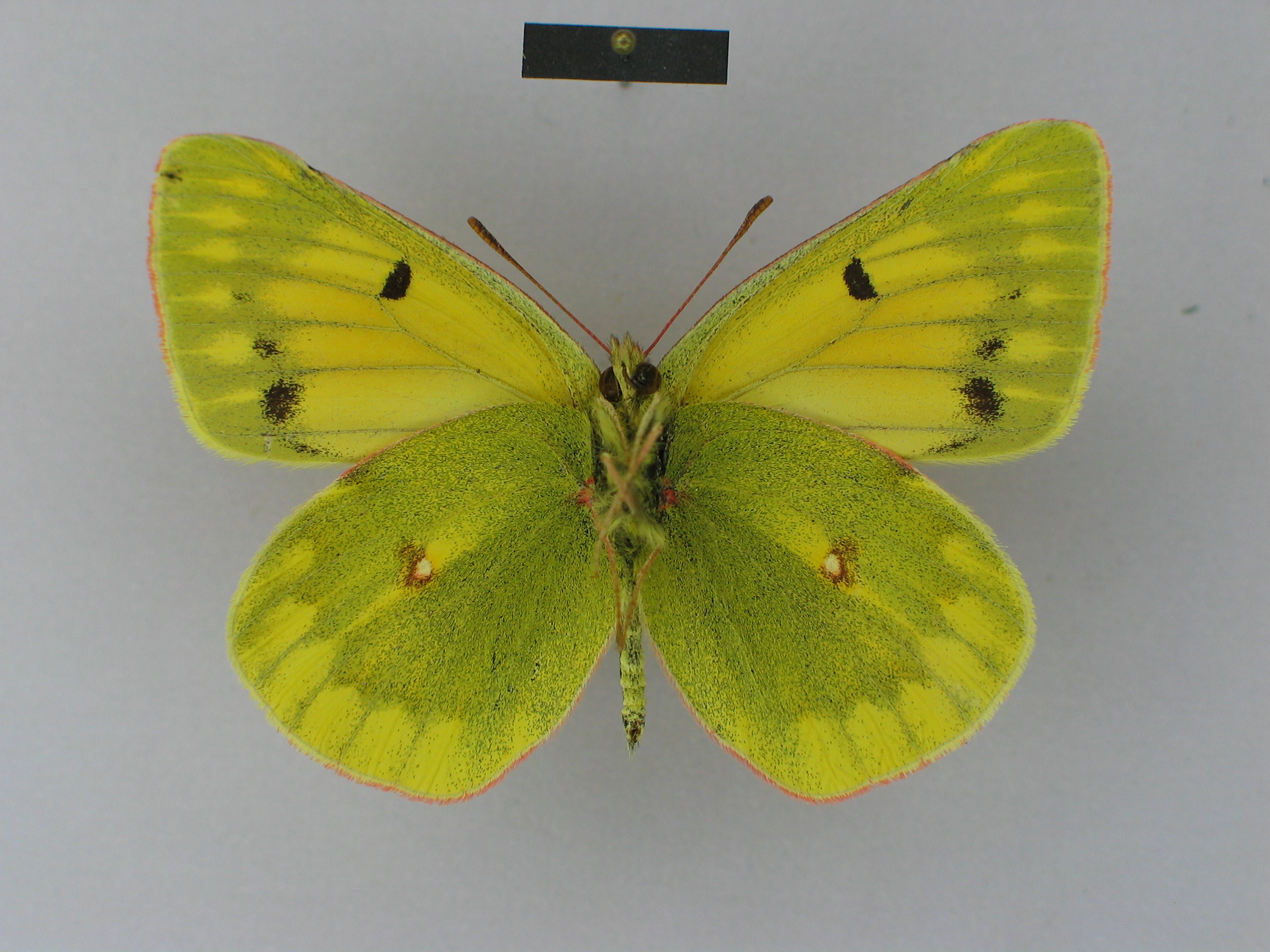
- ventral side; scalebar=1 cm

Scientific classification
- Kingdom: Animalia
- Phylum: Arthropoda
- Class: Insecta
- Order: Lepidoptera
- Family: Pieridae
- Genus: Colias
- Species: C. nina

Binomial name
- Colias nina Fawcett, 1904

= Colias nina =

Fawcett's clouded yellow

Species of butterfly

Colias nina, Fawcett's clouded yellow, is a small butterfly of the family Pieridae - that is, the yellows and whites - that is found in India.

== See also ==
- List of butterflies of India
- List of butterflies of India (Pieridae)
