= Catephia xylois =

Scientific classification
- Kingdom: Animalia
- Phylum: Arthropoda
- Clade: Pancrustacea
- Class: Insecta
- Order: Lepidoptera
- Superfamily: Noctuoidea
- Family: Erebidae
- Genus: Catephia
- Species: C. xylois

Binomial name
- Catephia xylois (Prout, 1925)

Synonyms
- Anophia xylois Prout, 1925

Species of moth

Catephia xylois is a species of moth of the family Erebidae. It is found in Malaysia.
