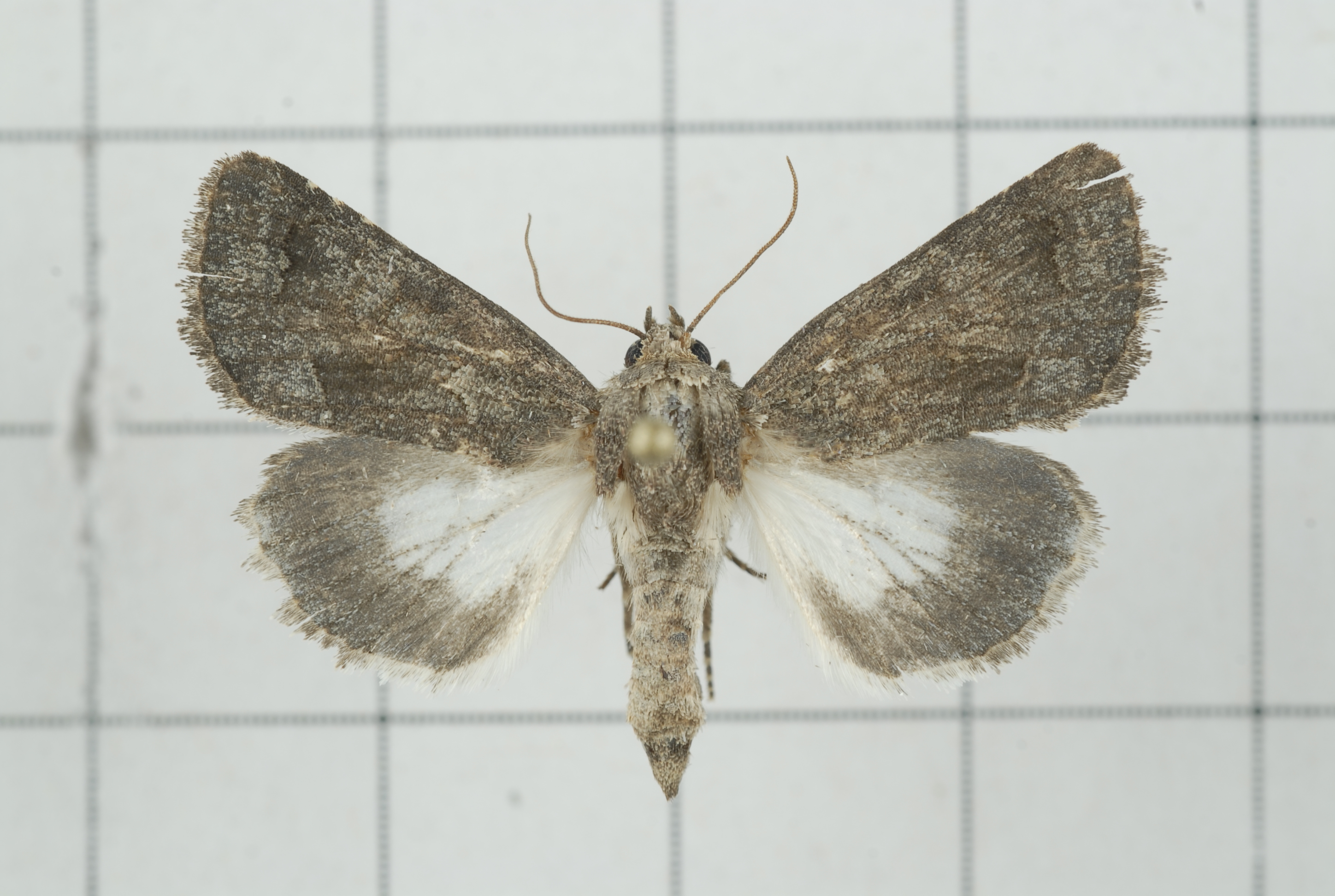

Scientific classification
- Domain: Eukaryota
- Kingdom: Animalia
- Phylum: Arthropoda
- Class: Insecta
- Order: Lepidoptera
- Superfamily: Noctuoidea
- Family: Erebidae
- Genus: Catephia
- Species: C. obscura

Binomial name
- Catephia obscura (Wileman, 1914)

Synonyms
- Aedia obscura Wileman, 1914

= Catephia obscura =

Species of moth

Catephia obscura is a species of moth of the family Erebidae. It is found in Taiwan.
