= Catephia lobata =

Scientific classification
- Kingdom: Animalia
- Phylum: Arthropoda
- Clade: Pancrustacea
- Class: Insecta
- Order: Lepidoptera
- Superfamily: Noctuoidea
- Family: Erebidae
- Genus: Catephia
- Species: C. lobata

Binomial name
- Catephia lobata (Prout, 1928)

Synonyms
- Idicara lobata Prout, 1928; Aedia lobata Prout, 1928

Species of moth

Catephia lobata is a species of moth of the family Erebidae. It is found in Indonesia (Sumatra).
