= Nagia amplificans =

Scientific classification
- Kingdom: Animalia
- Phylum: Arthropoda
- Class: Insecta
- Order: Lepidoptera
- Superfamily: Noctuoidea
- Family: Erebidae
- Genus: Nagia
- Species: N. amplificans

Binomial name
- Nagia amplificans (Walker, 1858)

Synonyms
- Catophia amplificans Walker, 1858; Catephia amplificans

Species of moth

Nagia amplificans is a species of moth in the family Erebidae. It is found in South Africa, where it has been recorded from KwaZulu-Natal.
