= Catephia corticea =

Scientific classification
- Domain: Eukaryota
- Kingdom: Animalia
- Phylum: Arthropoda
- Class: Insecta
- Order: Lepidoptera
- Superfamily: Noctuoidea
- Family: Erebidae
- Genus: Catephia
- Species: C. corticea

Binomial name
- Catephia corticea Le Cerf, 1922

Synonyms
- Catephia corticea ab. diffusa Le Cerf, 1922

Species of moth

Catephia corticea is a species of moth of the family Erebidae. It is found in Kenya.
