= Catephia olivacea =

Scientific classification
- Kingdom: Animalia
- Phylum: Arthropoda
- Class: Insecta
- Order: Lepidoptera
- Superfamily: Noctuoidea
- Family: Erebidae
- Genus: Catephia
- Species: C. olivacea

Binomial name
- Catephia olivacea (Walker, 1863)

Synonyms
- Idicara olivacea Walker, 1863

Species of moth

Catephia olivacea is a species of moth of the family Erebidae. It is found on Borneo.

Adults are greenish cinereous, the forewings thinly black-speckled, with black basal, interior and exterior zigzag lines. The reniform spot is incompletely bordered with black and there is a short broad blackish mark near the exterior border towards the tip. The marginal spots are black. The hindwings are brown, but white towards the base.
