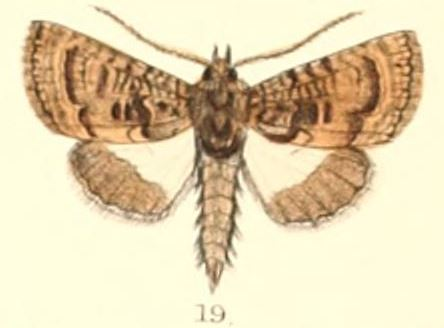

Scientific classification
- Domain: Eukaryota
- Kingdom: Animalia
- Phylum: Arthropoda
- Class: Insecta
- Order: Lepidoptera
- Superfamily: Noctuoidea
- Family: Erebidae
- Genus: Catephia
- Species: C. dentifera

Binomial name
- Catephia dentifera (Moore, 1882)

Synonyms
- Zarima dentifera Moore, 1882

= Catephia dentifera =

Species of moth

Catephia dentifera is a species of moth of the family Erebidae first described by Frederic Moore in 1882. It is found in India, Nepal and Vietnam.
