= Catephia eurymelas =

Scientific classification
- Kingdom: Animalia
- Phylum: Arthropoda
- Clade: Pancrustacea
- Class: Insecta
- Order: Lepidoptera
- Superfamily: Noctuoidea
- Family: Erebidae
- Genus: Catephia
- Species: C. eurymelas

Binomial name
- Catephia eurymelas Hampson, 1916

Species of moth

Catephia eurymelas is a species of moth of the family Erebidae. It is found in Kenya.

The wingspan is 22–26 mm. The forewings are grey, partly suffused with reddish brown. There is an oblique whitish shade from the costa towards the apex to the end of cell, as well as a subbasal black striga from the costa and an oblique streak above vein 1. The antemedial line is double, the outer line black and the inner indistinct, waved and angled inwards above the inner margin. The claviform spot is slightly defined by black and the orbicular and reniform spots are defined by black. The postmedial line is blackish with some white points beyond it on the costa. The subterminal line is reddish brown and there is a terminal series of black points. The hindwings are white, with a black-brown terminal area.
