= Catephia pyramidalis =

Scientific classification
- Kingdom: Animalia
- Phylum: Arthropoda
- Class: Insecta
- Order: Lepidoptera
- Superfamily: Noctuoidea
- Family: Erebidae
- Genus: Catephia
- Species: C. pyramidalis

Binomial name
- Catephia pyramidalis Hampson, 1916

Species of moth

Catephia pyramidalis is a species of moth of the family Erebidae. It is found in Kenya.

== Description ==
The wingspan is 24–30 mm. The forewings are grey, suffused and irrorated with dark brown. The subbasal line is black and sinuous. The antemedial line is black and waved and the claviform spot is defined by black. The orbicular is defined by black and has a blackish point in the centre. The reniform spot has a blackish centre defined on the inner side by white and black lines and on the outer side by white. The medial line is blackish and there is a triangular whitish shade from the postmedial part of the costa to beyond the reniform. The postmedial line is black and strongly bent outwards below costa, then excurved with a curve inwards at the discal fold, with a sinuous dark line beyond it, and some white points on the costa. The subterminal line is dark brown and waved. The veins of the terminal area have slight dark streaks and there is a terminal series of small black lunules. The hindwings are white, the veins and inner area tinged with brown and the terminal area broadly fuscous brown.
