= Catephia cryptodisca =

Scientific classification
- Kingdom: Animalia
- Phylum: Arthropoda
- Class: Insecta
- Order: Lepidoptera
- Superfamily: Noctuoidea
- Family: Erebidae
- Genus: Catephia
- Species: C. cryptodisca

Binomial name
- Catephia cryptodisca Hampson, 1926

Species of moth

Catephia cryptodisca is a species of moth of the family Erebidae. It is found in Ghana and Nigeria.
