= Catephia pericyma =

Scientific classification
- Kingdom: Animalia
- Phylum: Arthropoda
- Class: Insecta
- Order: Lepidoptera
- Superfamily: Noctuoidea
- Family: Erebidae
- Genus: Catephia
- Species: C. pericyma

Binomial name
- Catephia pericyma Hampson, 1916

Species of moth

Catephia pericyma is a species of moth of the family Erebidae. It is found in Egypt, Kenya, Oman, Saudi Arabia, the United Arab Emirates and Yemen.

The wingspan is about 40 mm. The forewings are pale grey, thickly irrorated with brown and black. The veins beyond the cell have slight dark streaks and there is a black-brown fascia below the base of the submedian fold. The antemedial line is black and there is an oblique black-brown shade before it on the inner area, as well as a shade beyond it in the submedian interspace to the postmedial line, filling in the claviform spot, which is large, defined by black and extending to the cell. The orbicular and reniform spots are large and defined by black. There is a slight oblique brown shade from the middle of the costa extending into the reniform. The postmedial line is black with dark brown streaks beyond it, as well as a black streak just below vein two with a slight white mark below it beyond the postmedial line. The terminal line is waved and black. The hindwings are white, the inner area tinged with red-brown and the terminal area dark cupreous brown.
