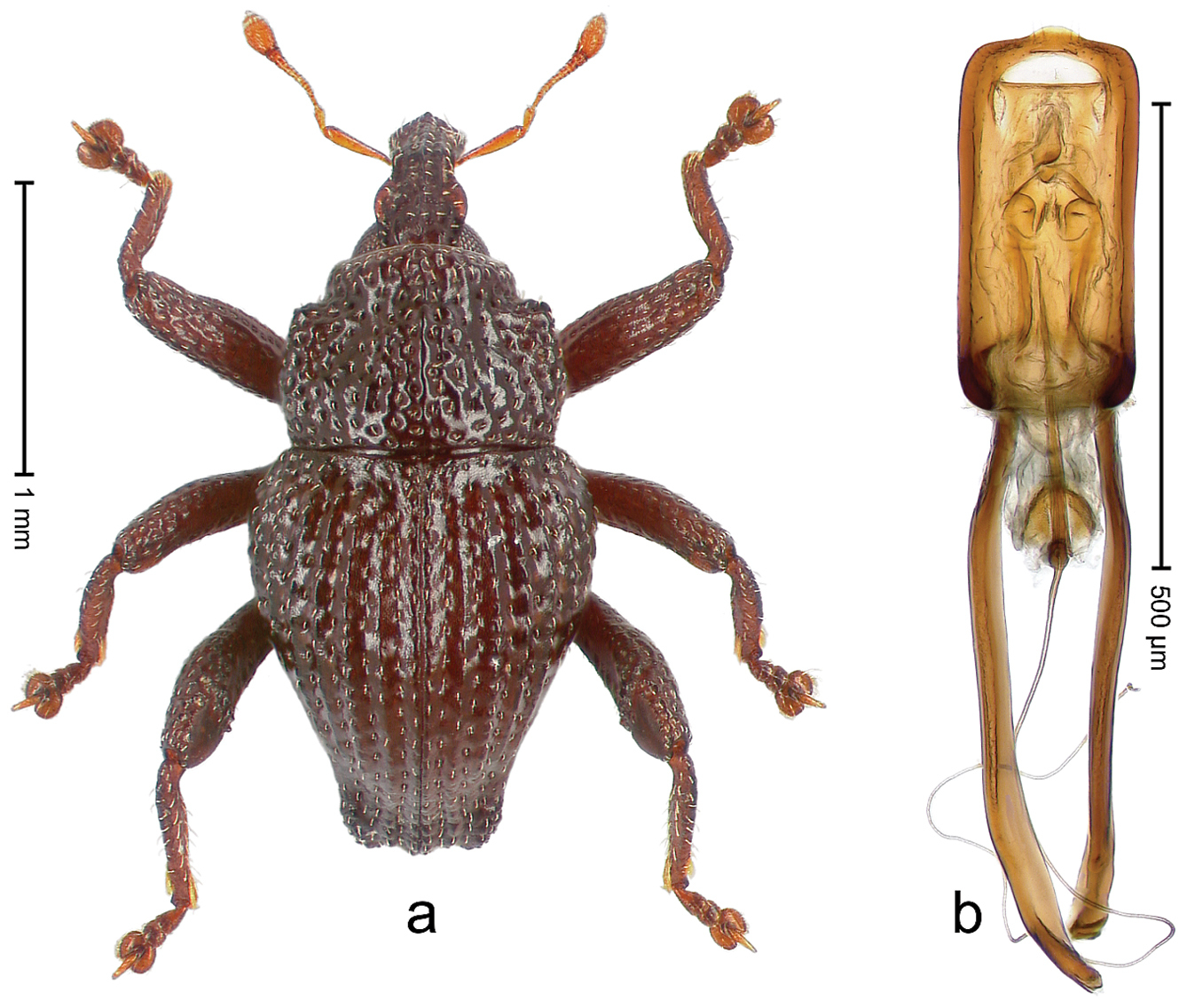

Scientific classification
- Kingdom: Animalia
- Phylum: Arthropoda
- Clade: Pancrustacea
- Class: Insecta
- Order: Coleoptera
- Suborder: Polyphaga
- Infraorder: Cucujiformia
- Family: Curculionidae
- Genus: Trigonopterus
- Species: T. javensis

Binomial name
- Trigonopterus javensis Riedel, 2014

= Trigonopterus javensis =

Species of beetle

Trigonopterus javensis is a species of flightless weevil in the genus Trigonopterus from Indonesia.

== Etymology ==
The specific name is derived from the island of Java.

== Description ==
Individuals measure 1.76–2.09 mm in length. The body is slightly hexagonal in shape. General coloration is rust-colored.

== Range ==
The species is found around elevations of 990–1,671 metres (3,248–5,482 ft) around Mount Gede, Mount Halimun Salak National Park, Mount Cakrabuana, and Mount Sawal in the Indonesian province of West Java, and on the Dieng Plateau and Mount Slamet in the Central Java province. The species is generally found inhabiting montane forests.

== Phylogeny ==
T. javensis is part of the T. dimorphus species group.
