= Catephia barrettae =

Scientific classification
- Kingdom: Animalia
- Phylum: Arthropoda
- Class: Insecta
- Order: Lepidoptera
- Superfamily: Noctuoidea
- Family: Erebidae
- Genus: Catephia
- Species: C. barrettae

Binomial name
- Catephia barrettae Hampson, 1905

Species of moth

Catephia barrettae is a species of moth of the family Erebidae. It is found in South Africa, where it has been recorded from the Eastern Cape.
