= Nagia vadoni =

Scientific classification
- Kingdom: Animalia
- Phylum: Arthropoda
- Class: Insecta
- Order: Lepidoptera
- Superfamily: Noctuoidea
- Family: Erebidae
- Genus: Nagia
- Species: N. vadoni

Binomial name
- Nagia vadoni Viette, 1968

Synonyms
- Catephia vadoni; Tolna vadoni (Viette, 1968)

Species of moth

Nagia vadoni is a species of moth in the family Erebidae. It is found on Madagascar.
