= Catephia abrostolica =

Scientific classification
- Kingdom: Animalia
- Phylum: Arthropoda
- Class: Insecta
- Order: Lepidoptera
- Superfamily: Noctuoidea
- Family: Erebidae
- Genus: Catephia
- Species: C. abrostolica

Binomial name
- Catephia abrostolica Hampson, 1926

Species of moth

Catephia abrostolica is a species of moth of the family Erebidae. It is found in Kenya, Tanzania and Uganda.
