= Nagia melipotica =

Scientific classification
- Domain: Eukaryota
- Kingdom: Animalia
- Phylum: Arthropoda
- Class: Insecta
- Order: Lepidoptera
- Superfamily: Noctuoidea
- Family: Erebidae
- Genus: Nagia
- Species: N. melipotica

Binomial name
- Nagia melipotica Hampson, 1926

Synonyms
- Catephia melipotica

Species of moth

Nagia melipotica is a species of moth in the family Erebidae. It is found in South Africa.
