= Catephia scotosa =

Scientific classification
- Domain: Eukaryota
- Kingdom: Animalia
- Phylum: Arthropoda
- Class: Insecta
- Order: Lepidoptera
- Superfamily: Noctuoidea
- Family: Erebidae
- Genus: Catephia
- Species: C. scotosa

Binomial name
- Catephia scotosa (Holland, 1894)

Synonyms
- Aedia scotosa Holland, 1894

Species of moth

Catephia scotosa is a species of moth of the family Erebidae. It is found in Gabon.
