= Nagia natalensis =

Scientific classification
- Kingdom: Animalia
- Phylum: Arthropoda
- Clade: Pancrustacea
- Class: Insecta
- Order: Lepidoptera
- Superfamily: Noctuoidea
- Family: Erebidae
- Genus: Nagia
- Species: N. natalensis

Binomial name
- Nagia natalensis (Hampson, 1902)

Synonyms
- Catephia natalensis Hampson, 1902

Species of moth

Nagia natalensis is a species of moth in the family Erebidae. It is found in South Africa, Oman and.the Yemeni island of Socotra.
