= Catephia shisa =

Scientific classification
- Kingdom: Animalia
- Phylum: Arthropoda
- Clade: Pancrustacea
- Class: Insecta
- Order: Lepidoptera
- Superfamily: Noctuoidea
- Family: Erebidae
- Genus: Catephia
- Species: C. shisa

Binomial name
- Catephia shisa Strand, 1920

Species of moth

Catephia shisa is a species of moth of the family Erebidae. It is found in Taiwan.
