= Catephia stygia =

Scientific classification
- Kingdom: Animalia
- Phylum: Arthropoda
- Class: Insecta
- Order: Lepidoptera
- Superfamily: Noctuoidea
- Family: Erebidae
- Genus: Catephia
- Species: C. stygia

Binomial name
- Catephia stygia Hampson, 1926

Species of moth

Catephia stygia is a species of moth of the family Erebidae. It is found in western China.
