= Catephia nigropicta =

Scientific classification
- Kingdom: Animalia
- Phylum: Arthropoda
- Clade: Pancrustacea
- Class: Insecta
- Order: Lepidoptera
- Superfamily: Noctuoidea
- Family: Erebidae
- Genus: Catephia
- Species: C. nigropicta

Binomial name
- Catephia nigropicta (Saalmüller, 1880)

Synonyms
- Anophia nigropicta Saalmüller, 1880

Species of moth

Catephia nigropicta is a species of moth of the family Erebidae. It is found in Madagascar.
