= Catephia thricophora =

Scientific classification
- Kingdom: Animalia
- Phylum: Arthropoda
- Class: Insecta
- Order: Lepidoptera
- Superfamily: Noctuoidea
- Family: Erebidae
- Genus: Catephia
- Species: C. thricophora

Binomial name
- Catephia thricophora Hampson, 1894

Species of moth

Catephia thricophora is a species of moth of the family Erebidae. It is found in Burma.
