= Catephia discophora =

Scientific classification
- Kingdom: Animalia
- Phylum: Arthropoda
- Class: Insecta
- Order: Lepidoptera
- Superfamily: Noctuoidea
- Family: Erebidae
- Genus: Catephia
- Species: C. discophora

Binomial name
- Catephia discophora Hampson, 1926

Species of moth

Catephia discophora is a species of moth of the family Erebidae. It is found in South Africa.
