= Nagia sacerdotis =

Scientific classification
- Domain: Eukaryota
- Kingdom: Animalia
- Phylum: Arthropoda
- Class: Insecta
- Order: Lepidoptera
- Superfamily: Noctuoidea
- Family: Erebidae
- Genus: Nagia
- Species: N. sacerdotis

Binomial name
- Nagia sacerdotis Hampson, 1926

Synonyms
- Catephia sacerdotis

Species of moth

Nagia sacerdotis is a species of moth in the family Erebidae. It is found in Malawi and South Africa.
