= Catephia oligomelas =

Scientific classification
- Domain: Eukaryota
- Kingdom: Animalia
- Phylum: Arthropoda
- Class: Insecta
- Order: Lepidoptera
- Superfamily: Noctuoidea
- Family: Erebidae
- Genus: Catephia
- Species: C. oligomelas

Binomial name
- Catephia oligomelas (Mabille, 1890)

Synonyms
- Anophia oligomelas Mabille, 1890

Species of moth

Catephia oligomelas is a species of moth of the family Erebidae. It is found in Ivory Coast.
