= Catephia philippinensis =

Scientific classification
- Kingdom: Animalia
- Phylum: Arthropoda
- Class: Insecta
- Order: Lepidoptera
- Superfamily: Noctuoidea
- Family: Erebidae
- Genus: Catephia
- Species: C. philippinensis

Binomial name
- Catephia philippinensis Wileman & West, 1929

Species of moth

Catephia philippinensis is a species of moth of the family Erebidae. It is found in the Philippines (Luzon).
