= Catephia albifasciata =

Scientific classification
- Domain: Eukaryota
- Kingdom: Animalia
- Phylum: Arthropoda
- Class: Insecta
- Order: Lepidoptera
- Superfamily: Noctuoidea
- Family: Erebidae
- Genus: Catephia
- Species: C. albifasciata

Binomial name
- Catephia albifasciata (Pinhey, 1968)

Synonyms
- Audea albifasciata Pinhey, 1968

Species of moth

Catephia albifasciata is a species of moth of the family Erebidae. It is found in Zimbabwe.
