= Nagia godfreyi =

Scientific classification
- Domain: Eukaryota
- Kingdom: Animalia
- Phylum: Arthropoda
- Class: Insecta
- Order: Lepidoptera
- Superfamily: Noctuoidea
- Family: Erebidae
- Genus: Nagia
- Species: N. godfreyi

Binomial name
- Nagia godfreyi Tams, 1924

Synonyms
- Catephia godfreyi

Species of moth

Nagia godfreyi is a species of moth in the family Erebidae. It is found in Thailand.
