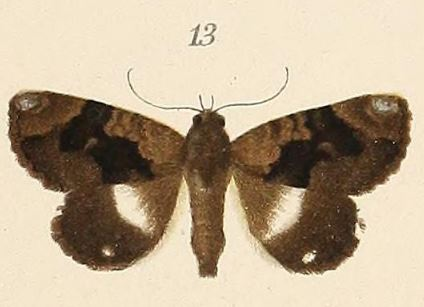

Scientific classification
- Kingdom: Animalia
- Phylum: Arthropoda
- Class: Insecta
- Order: Lepidoptera
- Superfamily: Noctuoidea
- Family: Erebidae
- Tribe: Catephiini
- Genus: Nagia; Walker, 1858

= Nagia =

Genus of moths

Nagia is a genus of moths of the family Erebidae. The genus was erected by Francis Walker in 1858.

== Species ==
- Nagia amplificans (Walker, 1858)
- Nagia dentiscripta A. E. Prout, 1921
- Nagia episcopalis Hampson, 1926
- Nagia evanescens Hampson, 1926
- Nagia godfreyi Tams, 1924
- Nagia gravipes Walker, 1858
- Nagia homotona Hampson, 1926
- Nagia linteola (Guenee, 1852)
- Nagia melipotica Hampson, 1926
- Nagia microsema Hampson, 1926
- Nagia monosema Hampson, 1926
- Nagia natalensis (Hampson, 1902)
- Nagia promota (Pagenstecher, 1907)
- Nagia pseudonatalensis (Strand, 1912)
- Nagia runa (Swinhoe, 1902)
- Nagia sacerdotis Hampson, 1926
- Nagia sthenistica Hampson, 1926
- Nagia subalbida Hampson, 1926
- Nagia subterminalis Wileman & South, 1921
- Nagia vadoni Viette, 1968

== Taxonomy ==
The genus is treated as a synonym of Catephia by some authors.
