= Catephia cana =

Scientific classification
- Domain: Eukaryota
- Kingdom: Animalia
- Phylum: Arthropoda
- Class: Insecta
- Order: Lepidoptera
- Superfamily: Noctuoidea
- Family: Erebidae
- Genus: Catephia
- Species: C. cana

Binomial name
- Catephia cana (Brandt, 1939)

Synonyms
- Anophia cana Brandt, 1939

Species of moth

Catephia cana is a species of moth of the family Erebidae. It is found in Iran.
