= Nagia subterminalis =

Scientific classification
- Domain: Eukaryota
- Kingdom: Animalia
- Phylum: Arthropoda
- Class: Insecta
- Order: Lepidoptera
- Superfamily: Noctuoidea
- Family: Erebidae
- Genus: Nagia
- Species: N. subterminalis

Binomial name
- Nagia subterminalis Wileman & South, 1921

Synonyms
- Catephia subterminalis

Species of moth

Nagia subterminalis is a species of moth in the family Erebidae. It is found on Luzon in the Philippines.
