= Catephia xanthophaes =

Scientific classification
- Domain: Eukaryota
- Kingdom: Animalia
- Phylum: Arthropoda
- Class: Insecta
- Order: Lepidoptera
- Superfamily: Noctuoidea
- Family: Erebidae
- Genus: Catephia
- Species: C. xanthophaes

Binomial name
- Catephia xanthophaes (Bethune-Baker, 1911)

Synonyms
- Aedia xanthophaes Bethune-Baker, 1911

Species of moth

Catephia xanthophaes is a species of moth of the family Erebidae. It is found in Angola.
