= Catephia diphteroides =

Scientific classification
- Domain: Eukaryota
- Kingdom: Animalia
- Phylum: Arthropoda
- Class: Insecta
- Order: Lepidoptera
- Superfamily: Noctuoidea
- Family: Erebidae
- Genus: Catephia
- Species: C. diphteroides

Binomial name
- Catephia diphteroides (Moore, 1885)

Synonyms
- Anophia diphteroides Moore, 1885

Species of moth

Catephia diphteroides is a species of moth of the family Erebidae. It is found in Sri Lanka.

The forewings are dull olive-grey, crossed by two basal sinuous incomplete black hues, an entire antemedial line, two discal and a submarginal denticulated line, followed by a marginal dentated lunular line. There is an oval black orbicular ringlet mark and an irregular shaped reniform mark, the reniform mark being continued upward to the costa, and the orbicular joined beneath to a larger black ring mark. From the lower ringlet a short blackish streak extends to the discal line. All the markings are edged with white speckles, and the costal end of the markings is dilated and almost confluent. The hindwings have a white basal medial area. The costal border and a broad outer band are black.
