= Catephia molybdocrosis =

Scientific classification
- Kingdom: Animalia
- Phylum: Arthropoda
- Class: Insecta
- Order: Lepidoptera
- Superfamily: Noctuoidea
- Family: Erebidae
- Genus: Catephia
- Species: C. molybdocrosis

Binomial name
- Catephia molybdocrosis Hampson, 1926

Species of moth

Catephia molybdocrosis is a species of moth of the family Erebidae. It is found in southern China.
