= Catephia poliochroa =

Scientific classification
- Kingdom: Animalia
- Phylum: Arthropoda
- Class: Insecta
- Order: Lepidoptera
- Superfamily: Noctuoidea
- Family: Erebidae
- Genus: Catephia
- Species: C. poliochroa

Binomial name
- Catephia poliochroa Hampson, 1916

Species of moth

Catephia poliochroa is a species of moth of the family Erebidae. It is found in Kenya.

The wingspan is about 40 mm. The forewings are whitish, suffused with brownish grey. The subbasal and antemedial lines are black. There is a slight oblique black streak before the latter, above the inner margin. The claviform spot is red-brown, defined by black and with a black streak from it to the postmedial line. The orbicular and reniform spots are defined by blackish except above and there is an oblique blackish shade from the costa to the reniform, as well as a waved line from the submedian fold to the inner margin. The postmedial line is black. There is a faint waved whitish subterminal line with slight blackish streaks before it in the interspaces, as well as a fine waved black terminal line. The hindwings are white, with a fuscous brown terminal area. The inner area is tinged with brown.
