= Catephia nigrijuncta =

Scientific classification
- Domain: Eukaryota
- Kingdom: Animalia
- Phylum: Arthropoda
- Class: Insecta
- Order: Lepidoptera
- Superfamily: Noctuoidea
- Family: Erebidae
- Genus: Catephia
- Species: C. nigrijuncta

Binomial name
- Catephia nigrijuncta (Warren, 1914)

Synonyms
- Aedia nigrijuncta Warren, 1914

Species of moth

Catephia nigrijuncta is a species of moth of the family Erebidae. It is found in India.
