= Catephia compsotrephes =

Scientific classification
- Domain: Eukaryota
- Kingdom: Animalia
- Phylum: Arthropoda
- Class: Insecta
- Order: Lepidoptera
- Superfamily: Noctuoidea
- Family: Erebidae
- Genus: Catephia
- Species: C. compsotrephes

Binomial name
- Catephia compsotrephes Turner, 1932

Species of moth

Catephia compsotrephes is a species of moth of the family Erebidae first described by Alfred Jefferis Turner in 1932. It is found in north-western Australia.
