= Nagia runa =

Scientific classification
- Domain: Eukaryota
- Kingdom: Animalia
- Phylum: Arthropoda
- Class: Insecta
- Order: Lepidoptera
- Superfamily: Noctuoidea
- Family: Erebidae
- Genus: Nagia
- Species: N. runa

Binomial name
- Nagia runa (Swinhoe, 1902)

Synonyms
- Catephia runa Swinhoe, 1902

Species of moth

Nagia runa is a species of moth in the family Erebidae. It is found on Borneo and in Singapore and Peninsular Malaysia. The habitat consists of lowland areas.
