= Nagia pseudonatalensis =

Scientific classification
- Kingdom: Animalia
- Phylum: Arthropoda
- Clade: Pancrustacea
- Class: Insecta
- Order: Lepidoptera
- Superfamily: Noctuoidea
- Family: Erebidae
- Genus: Nagia
- Species: N. pseudonatalensis

Binomial name
- Nagia pseudonatalensis (Strand, 1912)

Synonyms
- Catephia pseudonatalensis Strand, 1912

Species of moth

Nagia pseudonatalensis is a species of moth in the family Erebidae. It is found in Tanzania.
