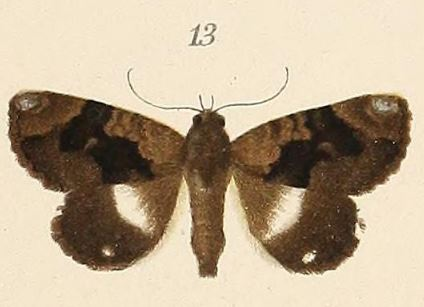

Scientific classification
- Domain: Eukaryota
- Kingdom: Animalia
- Phylum: Arthropoda
- Class: Insecta
- Order: Lepidoptera
- Superfamily: Noctuoidea
- Family: Erebidae
- Genus: Nagia
- Species: N. promota

Binomial name
- Nagia promota (Pagenstecher, 1907)

Synonyms
- Catephia promota Pagenstecher, 1907

= Nagia promota =

Species of moth

Nagia promota is a species of moth in the family Erebidae, this species occurs in Madagascar.

This species has a wingspan of 35 mm.
