= Nagia sthenistica =

Scientific classification
- Domain: Eukaryota
- Kingdom: Animalia
- Phylum: Arthropoda
- Class: Insecta
- Order: Lepidoptera
- Superfamily: Noctuoidea
- Family: Erebidae
- Genus: Nagia
- Species: N. sthenistica

Binomial name
- Nagia sthenistica Hampson, 1926

Synonyms
- Nagia stenistica; Catephia sthenistica

Species of moth

Nagia sthenistica is a species of moth in the family Erebidae. It is found in Australia, where it has been recorded from Western Australia.
