= Nagia linteola =

Scientific classification
- Kingdom: Animalia
- Phylum: Arthropoda
- Class: Insecta
- Order: Lepidoptera
- Superfamily: Noctuoidea
- Family: Erebidae
- Genus: Nagia
- Species: N. linteola

Binomial name
- Nagia linteola (Guenée, 1852)

Synonyms
- Nagia accolytis Hampson, 1926; Catephia linteola Guenée, 1852; Catephia ecclesiastica Butler, 1874; Nagia griveaudi Viette, 1968; Nagia hieratica Hampson, 1926; Nagia homotima Tams, 1935; Serrodes leucocelis Mabille, 1880; Nagia megaruna de Joannis, 1932; Catephia pilipes Guenée, 1852; Nagia proselytis Hampson, 1926; Catephia syba Guenée, 1852; Nagia monastica Hampson, 1926

Species of moth

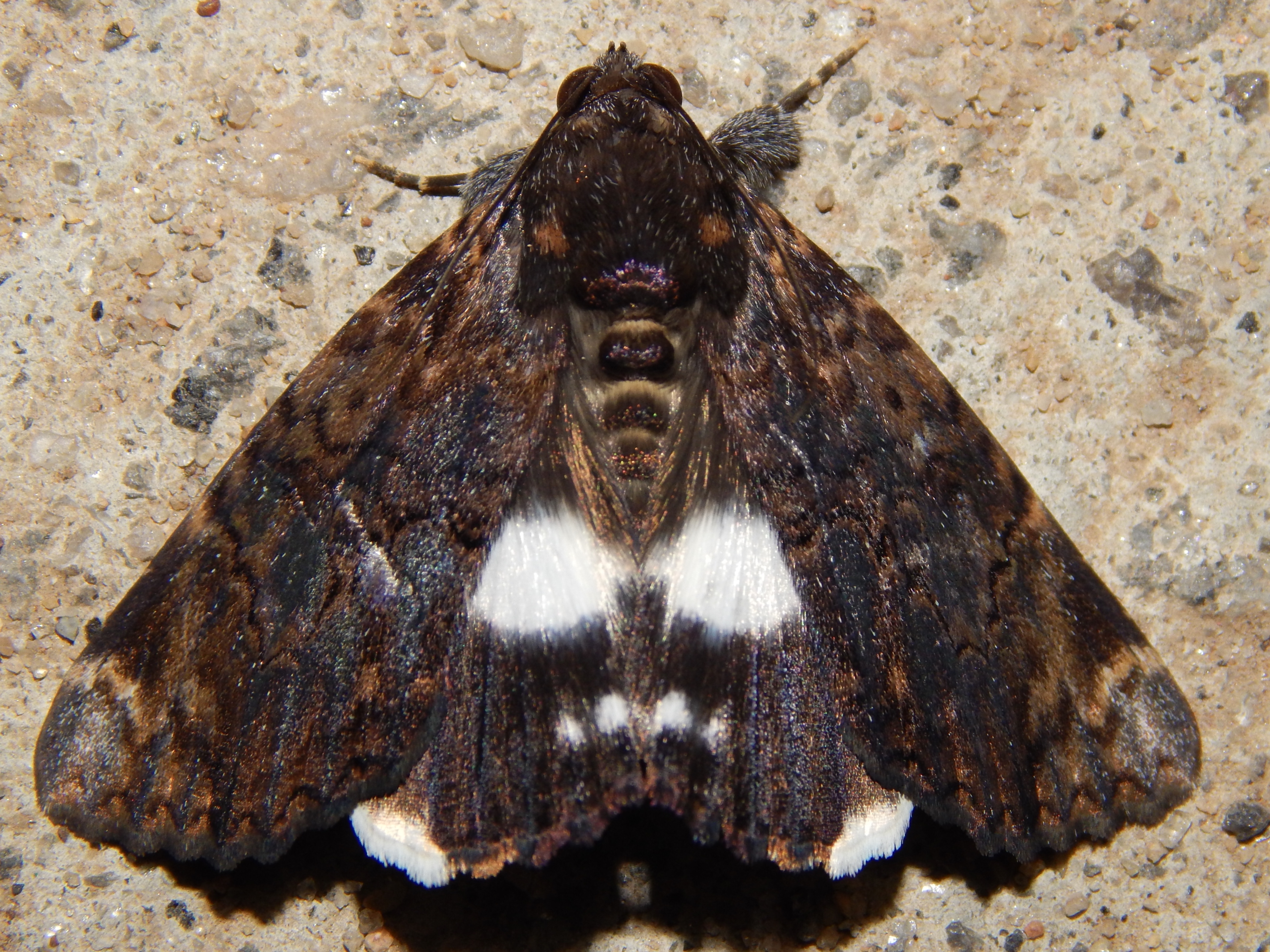

Nagia linteola is a species of moth in the family Erebidae first described by Achille Guenée in 1852. This species occurs in South Africa, the Democratic Republic of the Congo, Yemen, the Comoros, Mauritius, Madagascar, Indonesia (Borneo), India, Sri Lanka, Myanmar, Thailand and in Australia, where it has been recorded from Western Australia, the Northern Territory, Queensland and Victoria.

== Description ==
The wingspan is about 56–66 mm. Antennae of male almost simple. Forelegs in male with thick tufts of scales from coxa and very long hairs from femur and tibia. Head and thorax black and dark red-brown with a purplish gloss. Abdomen blackish. Forewings red-brown with more or less black. A short sub-basal line can be seen. waved antemedial, medial, and post-medial line present, where the postmedial highly angled outwards beyond end of cell. A small black spot or ring-spot in cell and indistinct reniform spot with ring-spot below it. Traces of an irregularly waved sub-marginal line present and apex irrorated with white. Hindwings black with a pure white medial band not reaching inner margin. Apex white and some white sub-marginal spots more or less developed towards anal angle.

Larva has greyish-brownish-green head, lined thinly with brown. Body colour is similar to head, but with chocolate colours. Tubercles light reddish brown. Ventrally whitish, with black patches in between the prolegs and true legs. Pupation takes place in a cocoon spun on a tree trunk.

The larvae feed on Terminalia elliptica, Corymbia tesselaris and Lagerstroemia speciosa species.
