= Aedia arctipennis =

Scientific classification
- Domain: Eukaryota
- Kingdom: Animalia
- Phylum: Arthropoda
- Class: Insecta
- Order: Lepidoptera
- Superfamily: Noctuoidea
- Family: Erebidae
- Genus: Aedia
- Species: A. arctipennis

Binomial name
- Aedia arctipennis (Hulstaert, 1924)

Synonyms
- Catephia arctipennis Hulstaert, 1924; Catephia canescens Hampson, 1926

Species of moth

Aedia arctipennis is a species of moth of the family Noctuidae. It is found in Indonesia (Tenimbar Islands) and Australia, where it has been recorded from Western Australia, the Northern Territory and Queensland.

The larvae feed on Ipomoea pes-carpae. Full-grown larvae reach a length of about 30 mm. Pupation takes place underground in a cocoon.
