= Streptomyces javensis =

Scientific classification
- Domain: Bacteria
- Kingdom: Bacillati
- Phylum: Actinomycetota
- Class: Actinomycetes
- Order: Streptomycetales
- Family: Streptomycetaceae
- Genus: Streptomyces
- Species: S. javensis

Binomial name
- Streptomyces javensis Sembiring et al. 2001

Type strain
- B22P3, B22P3 (B26), DSM 41764, JCM 11446, NBRC 100777, NCIMB 13679

Species of bacterium

Streptomyces javensis is a bacterium species from the genus of Streptomyces.

== See also ==
- List of Streptomyces species
