= Nagia gravipes =

Scientific classification
- Kingdom: Animalia
- Phylum: Arthropoda
- Class: Insecta
- Order: Lepidoptera
- Superfamily: Noctuoidea
- Family: Erebidae
- Genus: Nagia
- Species: N. gravipes

Binomial name
- Nagia gravipes Walker, 1858

Synonyms
- Catephia gravipes

Species of moth

Nagia gravipes is a species of moth in the family Erebidae. It is found in Sierra Leone and South Africa.
