= J. Malcolm Fawcett =

English cavalry officer and entomologist

James Farish Malcolm Fawcett (27 July 1855 – 26 November 1924) was a British cavalry officer of the 5th Lancers. He was also an entomologist who specialised in Lepidoptera.

== Life ==
Fawcett was born in Edinburgh, the son of James Fawcett, from an old Yorkshire gentry family (Fawcett of Scaleby Castle), and Susan Charlotte Augusta Wilkie, daughter of Revd. Dr. Daniel Wilkie, of Rathbyres and Gilchriston in Scotland, Minister of Greyfriars Kirk, Edinburgh. He was educated at Harrow School. He matriculated at Balliol College, Oxford in 1875 at the age of 19. In 1878, a cadet of the Royal Military College, Sandhurst, he became a second lieutenant in the 18th Hussars. He was promoted to lieutenant in 1881, to captain in 1884, and to major in 1892.

Fawcett served in the defence of Ladysmith 1899–1900 during the Second Boer War, with the rank of Lieutenant-Colonel, and was wounded on 22 December 1899. He was awarded the Queen's South Africa Medal with two clasps.

== Legacy ==
Fawcett's collection of African moths was acquired by Walter Rothschild for his museum at Tring and are now in the Natural History Museum in London. His butterflies were sold by auction. Fawcett's clouded yellow is named for him.

He entered the game record books for a nilgai from Bharatpur, Rajasthan.

== Works ==
- (1903). "Notes on the transformations of some South-African Lepidoptera". Transactions of the Zoological Society of London. vol. 17, part 2.
- (1904). Minutes of meeting 7 June 1904. Proceedings of the Zoological Society of London. (9): 8-9, in which some Colias species are newly described
- (1916). "Notes on a Collection of Heterocera made by Mr. W. Feather in British East Africa, 1911-13". Proceedings of the Zoological Society of London. pages 707–737.

== Family ==
Fawcett lived at Peckleton House, Hinckley, Leicestershire, and was married on 20 October 1888 to Caroline Agar-Ellis (1866–1891), daughter of Leopold Agar-Ellis, 5th Viscount Clifden.
