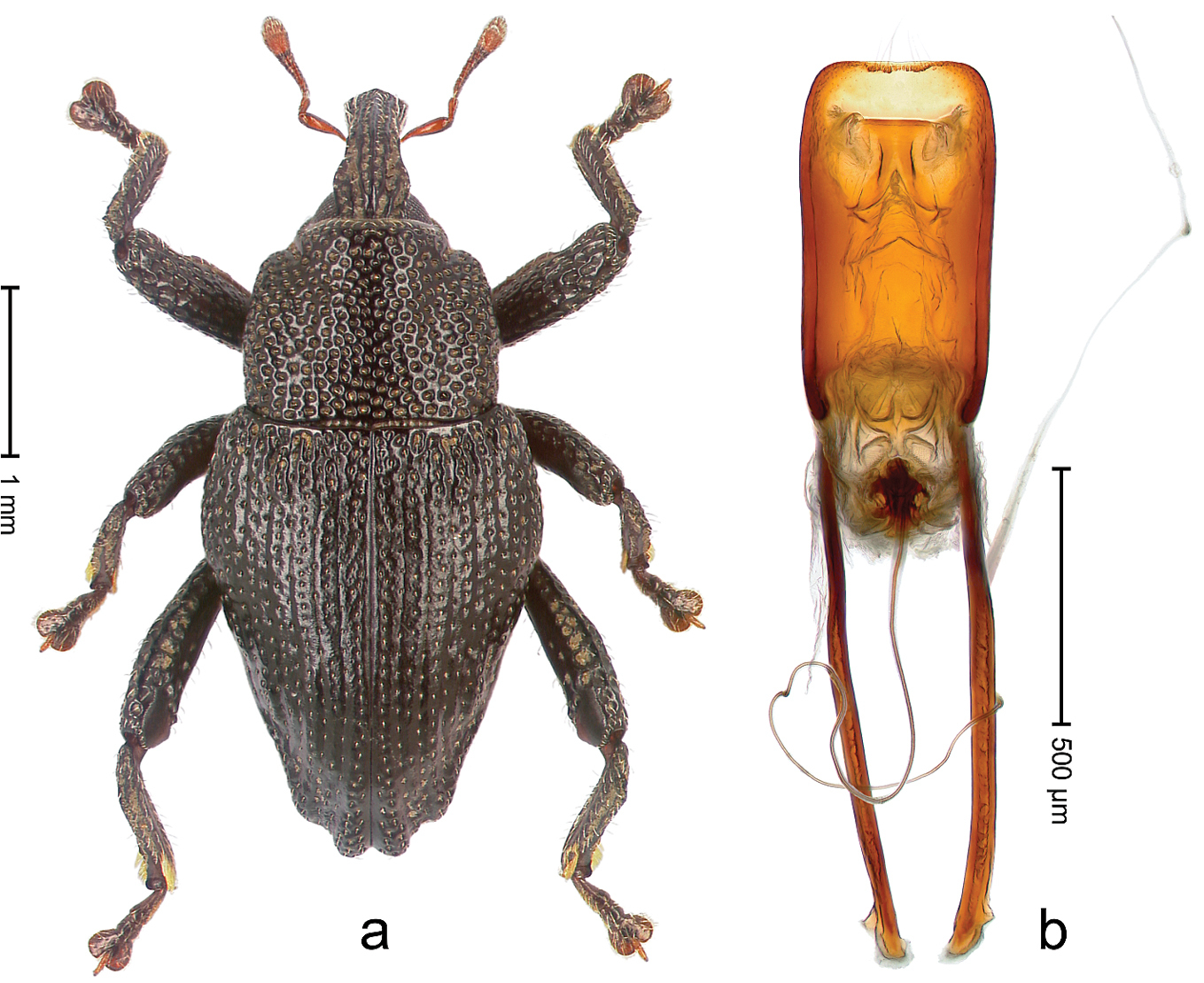

Scientific classification
- Kingdom: Animalia
- Phylum: Arthropoda
- Clade: Pancrustacea
- Class: Insecta
- Order: Coleoptera
- Suborder: Polyphaga
- Infraorder: Cucujiformia
- Family: Curculionidae
- Genus: Trigonopterus
- Species: T. dimorphus

Binomial name
- Trigonopterus dimorphus Riedel, 2014

= Trigonopterus dimorphus =

Species of beetle

Trigonopterus dimorphus is a species of flightless weevil in the genus Trigonopterus from Indonesia.

== Etymology ==
The specific name is derived from di-, a prefix meaning "two", and the Greek word morphe, meaning gestalt.

== Description ==
Individuals measure 2.94–3.80 mm in length. The body is elongated. General coloration is black, except for the antennae, tarsi, and tibiae, which are rust-colored.

== Range ==
The species is found around elevations of 1,000–1,200 metres (3,300–3,900 ft) in Mount Halimun Salak National Park in the Indonesian province of West Java.

== Phylogeny ==
T. dimorphus is part of the T. dimorphus species group.
