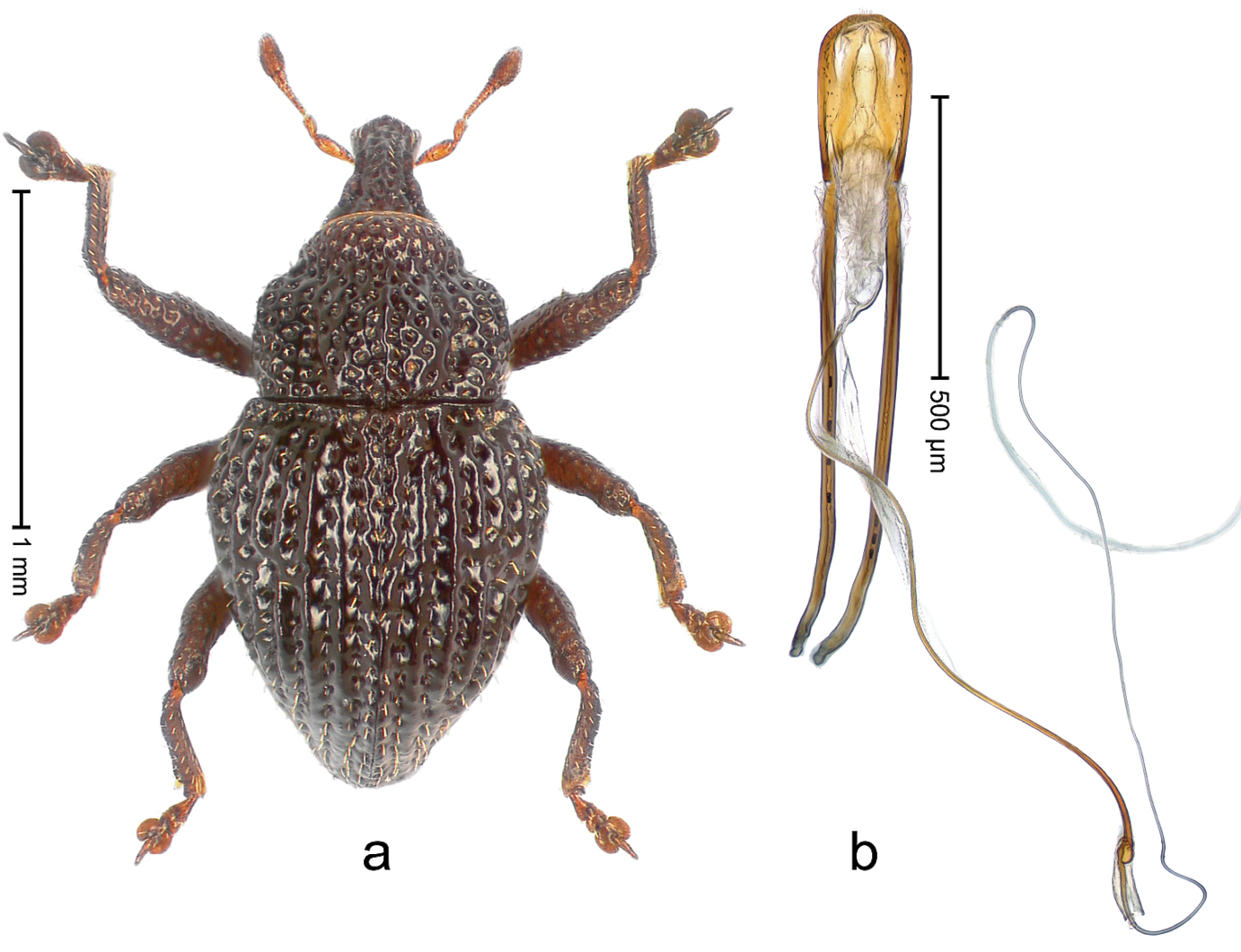
- Holotype specimen and penis.

Scientific classification
- Kingdom: Animalia
- Phylum: Arthropoda
- Class: Insecta
- Order: Coleoptera
- Suborder: Polyphaga
- Infraorder: Cucujiformia
- Family: Curculionidae
- Genus: Trigonopterus
- Species: T. pseudoflorensis

Binomial name
- Trigonopterus pseudoflorensis Riedel, 2014

= Trigonopterus pseudoflorensis =

Species of beetle

Trigonopterus pseudoflorensis is a species of flightless weevil in the genus Trigonopterus from Indonesia.

== Etymology ==
The specific name is derived from the Greek word pseudo-, meaning "false", combined with the specific name of the related species T. florensis.

== Description ==
Individuals measure 1.70–2.14 mm in length. General coloration is black, except for the legs and head, which are rust-colored.

== Range ==
The species is found around elevations of 1,995–2,010 metres (6,545–6,594 ft) on Mount Ranaka on the island of Flores, part of the Indonesian province of East Nusa Tenggara.

== Phylogeny ==
T. pseudoflorensis is part of the T. relictus species group. It bears morphological similarities to T. florensis and T. paraflorensis.
