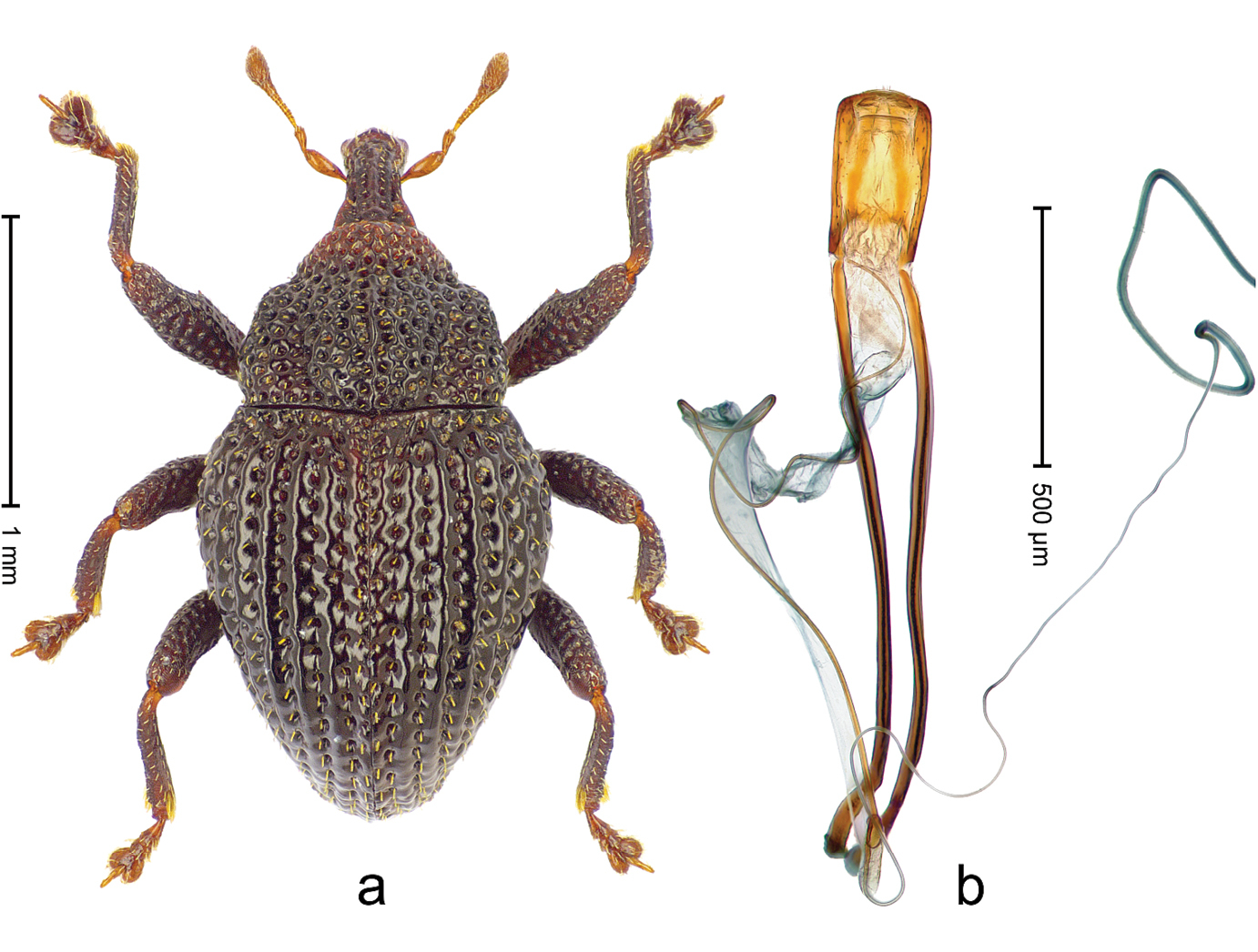
- Holotype specimen and penis

Scientific classification
- Kingdom: Animalia
- Phylum: Arthropoda
- Class: Insecta
- Order: Coleoptera
- Suborder: Polyphaga
- Infraorder: Cucujiformia
- Family: Curculionidae
- Genus: Trigonopterus
- Species: T. paraflorensis

Binomial name
- Trigonopterus paraflorensis Riedel, 2014

= Trigonopterus paraflorensis =

Species of beetle

Trigonopterus paraflorensis is a species of flightless weevil in the genus Trigonopterus from Indonesia.

== Etymology ==
The specific name is derived from the Greek word para-, meaning "next to", combined with the specific name of the related species T. florensis.

== Description ==
Individuals measure 1.70–2.20 mm in length. General coloration is black, with rust-colored legs and head.

== Range ==
The species is found around elevations of 1,730 metres (5,680 ft) on Mount Ranaka on the isle of Flores, part of the Indonesian province of East Nusa Tenggara.

== Phylogeny ==
T. paraflorensis is part of the T. relictus species group. It bears morphological similarities to T. florensis and T. pseudoflorensis.
