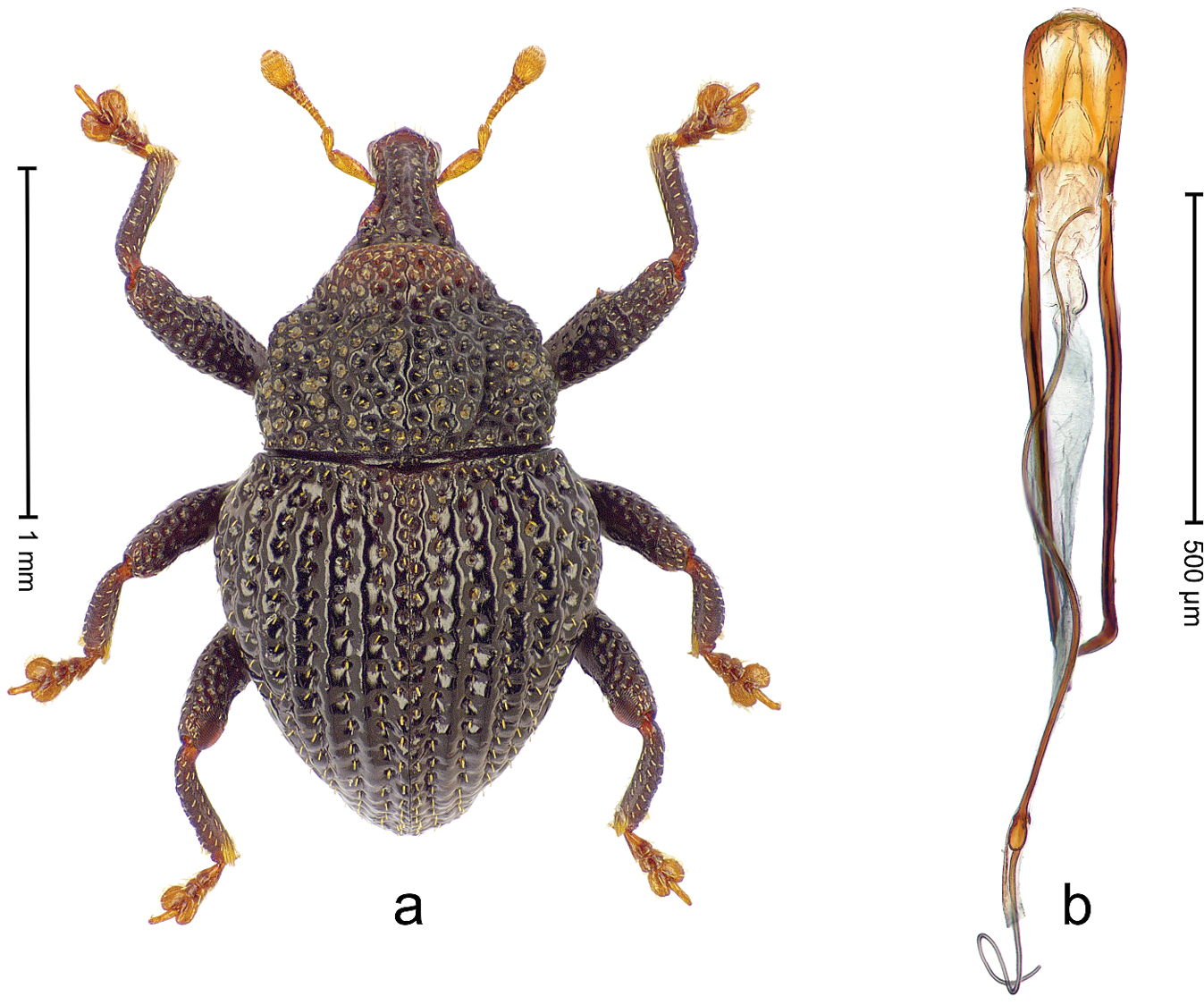

Scientific classification
- Kingdom: Animalia
- Phylum: Arthropoda
- Class: Insecta
- Order: Coleoptera
- Suborder: Polyphaga
- Infraorder: Cucujiformia
- Family: Curculionidae
- Genus: Trigonopterus
- Species: T. florensis

Binomial name
- Trigonopterus florensis Riedel, 2014

= Trigonopterus florensis =

Species of beetle

Trigonopterus florensis is a species of flightless weevil in the genus Trigonopterus from Indonesia.

== Etymology ==
The specific name is derived from that of the island of Flores.

== Description ==
Individuals measure 1.48–2.04 mm in length. General coloration is black, with rust colored antennae and tarsi. The elytra vary between black and dark rust-colored.

== Range ==
The species is found around elevations of 1,250–1,590 metres (4,100–5,220 ft) around Golo Lusang, Mount Ranaka, and Lake Ranamese on the island of Flores, part of the Indonesian province of East Nusa Tenggara.

== Phylogeny ==
T. florensis is part of the T. relictus species group. The species is similar morphologically to T. paraflorensis and T. pseudoflorensis.
