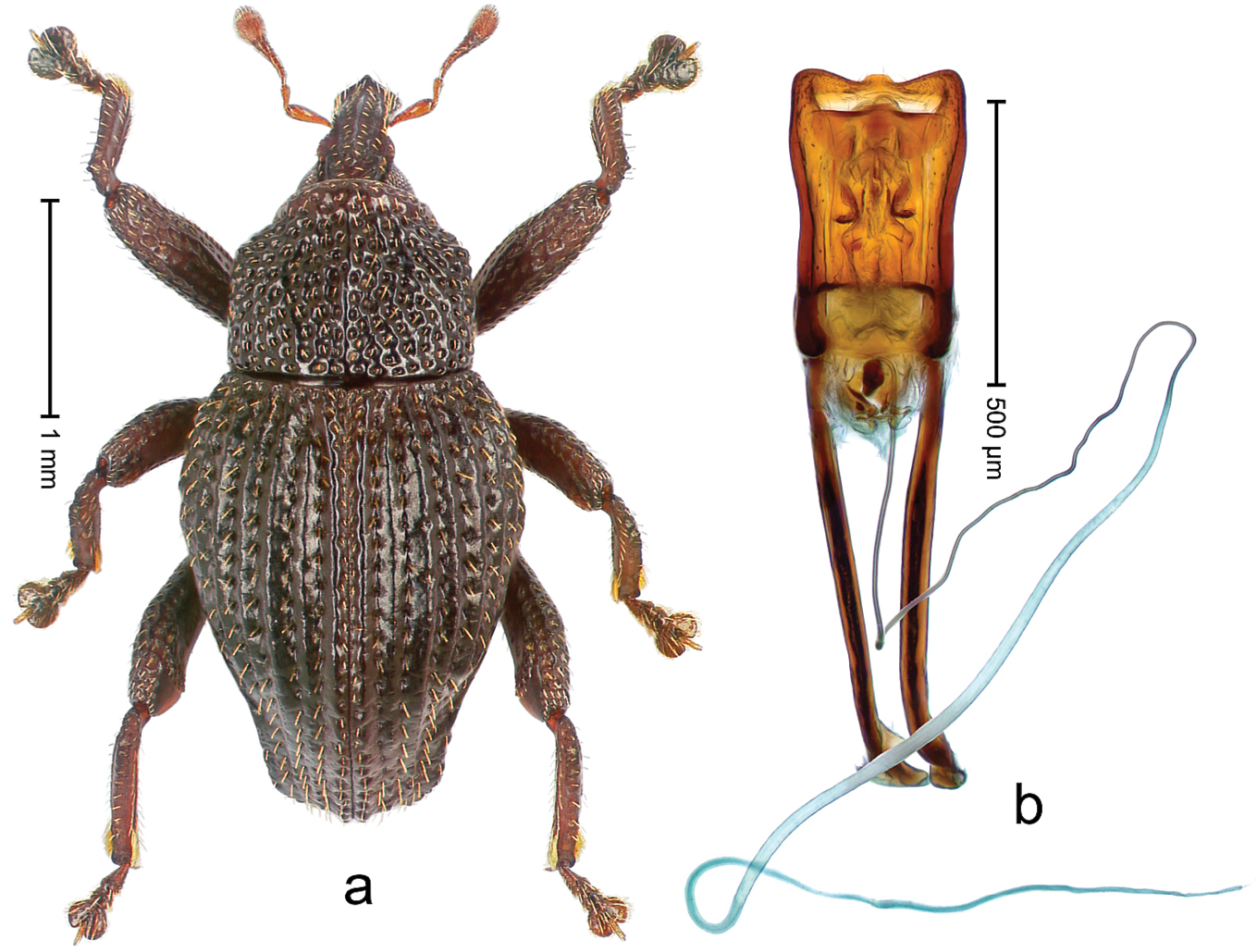

Scientific classification
- Kingdom: Animalia
- Phylum: Arthropoda
- Clade: Pancrustacea
- Class: Insecta
- Order: Coleoptera
- Suborder: Polyphaga
- Infraorder: Cucujiformia
- Family: Curculionidae
- Genus: Trigonopterus
- Species: T. cahyoi

Binomial name
- Trigonopterus cahyoi Riedel, 2014

= Trigonopterus cahyoi =

Species of beetle

Trigonopterus cahyoi is a species of flightless weevil in the genus Trigonopterus from Indonesia. The species was described in 2014 and is named after Cahyo Rahmadi, an arachnologist who collected the type specimens of the beetle. The beetle is 2.05–3.19 mm long. It has a black body with a ferruginous head and legs. Endemic to West Java, where it is known from Mount Cakrabuana and Mount Sawal at elevations of 990–1,593 m (3,250–5,230 ft).

== Taxonomy ==
Trigonopterus cahyoi was described by the entomologist Alexander Riedel in 2014 on the basis of an adult male specimen collected from Mount Cakrabuana on the island of Java in Indonesia. The species is named after Cahyo Rahmadi, an arachnologist who collected the type specimens of the beetle.

== Description ==
The beetle is 2.05–3.19 mm long. It has a black body with a ferruginous head and legs. The body is elongate, showing a distinct constriction between the pronotum and elytra in dorsal view, and a faint dorsal constriction in profile. The rostrum features a median carina that terminates at the forehead, flanked by a pair of submedian ridges. The furrows between these ridges contain rows of erect, piliform scales. Just behind the epistome, the ridges are shortened, and the epistome itself bears a transverse, angular ridge with a prominent median denticle.

The pronotum projects subangularly at the anterolateral corners and has an indistinct subapical constriction. Its surface is coarsely rugose-punctate, with each puncture containing a suberect piliform scale, and a median ridge is present. The elytral striae are deeply impressed, each bearing a row of suberect piliform scales. The intervals are raised (costate) and transversely rugose, with the costa of interval 2 shortened at the base. Interval 7 is swollen near the apex and slightly projects laterally. The elytral apex is extended ventrally, forming a beak-like shape. The meso- and metafemora have an anteroventral ridge that forms a faint blunt tooth. The metafemur also bears a subapical stridulatory patch and a transverse row of denticles. Abdominal ventrite 5 has a shallow pit near the apex.

The penis is moderately curved ventrally in profile, with subparallel sides in the basal half that gently diverge anteriorly. The apex has a small rounded median extension. The apodemes are twice the length of the penis body, and the ductus ejaculatorius lacks a bulbus.

Elytral coloration varies from completely black to ferruginous at the base and along the sutural interval. Females have a more slender body, while males are slightly broader, especially across the humeral region. The female rostrum features a pair of lateral furrows and submedian furrows that continue apically as coarse punctures; the epistome is simple. The female abdominal ventrite 5 is flat.

== Distribution ==
Trigonopterus cahyoi is endemic to the Indonesian province of West Java, where it is known from Mount Cakrabuana and Mount Sawal. It has been recorded at elevations of 990–1,593 m (3,250–5,230 ft).
