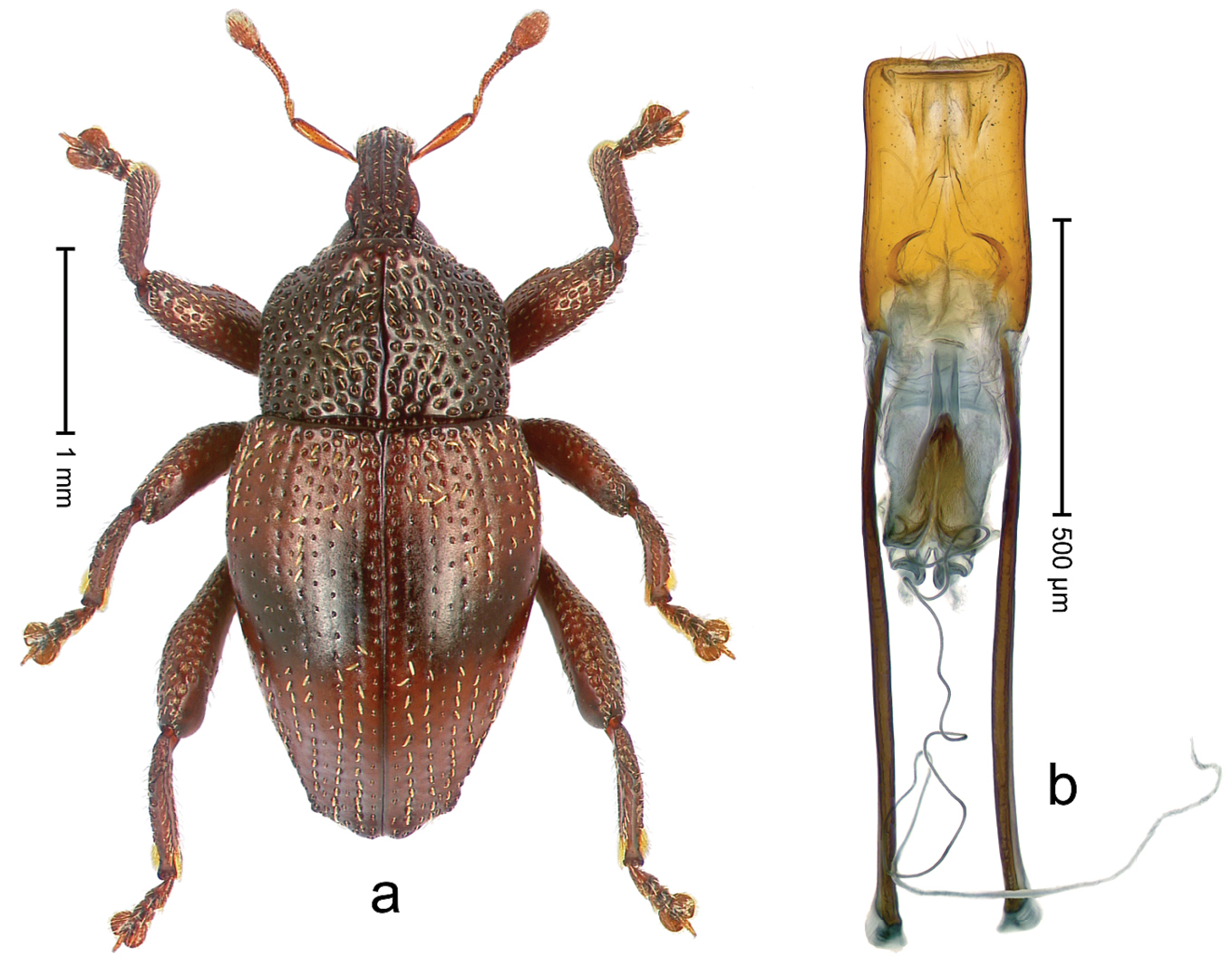

Scientific classification
- Kingdom: Animalia
- Phylum: Arthropoda
- Clade: Pancrustacea
- Class: Insecta
- Order: Coleoptera
- Suborder: Polyphaga
- Infraorder: Cucujiformia
- Family: Curculionidae
- Genus: Trigonopterus
- Species: T. argopurensis

Binomial name
- Trigonopterus argopurensis Riedel, 2014

= Trigonopterus argopurensis =

Species of beetle

Trigonopterus argopurensis is a species of flightless weevil in the genus Trigonopterus from Indonesia. The species was described in 2014. The beetle is 2.88–3.18 mm long. It has a reddish-brown head and legs, with the elytra also being reddish-brown but marked by a sinuate black transverse band. The rest of the body is black. Endemic to East Java, where it is known only from Mount Argopuro at elevations of 1,457–1,785 m (4,780–5,856 ft).

== Taxonomy ==
Trigonopterus argopurensis was described by the entomologist Alexander Riedel in 2014 on the basis of an adult male specimen collected from near Bremi village on Mount Argopuro, on the island of Java in Indonesia. The species is named after the mountain on which it was discovered.

== Description ==
The beetle is 2.88–3.18 mm long. It has a reddish-brown head and legs, with the elytra also being reddish-brown but marked by a sinuate black transverse band. The rest of the body is black. The body is elongated, with a pronounced constriction between the pronotum and elytron when viewed from above, and a convex profile. The rostrum has a median and a pair of submedian ridges, with the grooves between them punctured and each puncture bearing an erect seta. The epistome is simple.

The pronotum narrows near the tip and has a densely punctured surface. Some punctures are elongated or arranged in merged rows forming rhombus-like patterns. Each puncture contains a long, white scale or seta. A smooth central ridge runs along the middle. The elytra have indistinct striae and flat intervals, with small, irregular punctures. Sparse rows of long, flat, cream-colored scales are present, and the spaces between them are finely textured. In the apical third, interval 7 forms a sharp lateral edge, and the sutural interval is swollen and slightly protruding at the tip. The femora have a crenulate ridge on the underside that ends in a blunt tooth. The metafemur has a stridulatory patch near the tip. The upper edge of the tibiae has a simple angled projection near the base. The metatibia lacks a premucro at the tip. Abdominal ventrite 5 is flat and coarsely punctured.

The penis has nearly parallel sides and a rounded apex with a short central extension. The transfer apparatus is compact, with sickle-shaped processes and a smoothly curved ventral profile. The apodemes are 2.4 times the length of the penis body. The ductus ejaculatorius lacks a bulbus.

In females, the rostrum has smooth median and submedian ridges. The elytral apex is rounded in males and narrower and angled in females. Female abdominal ventrite 5 is flat.

== Range ==
Trigonopterus argopurensis is endemic to the Indonesian province of East Java, where it is known only from Mount Argopuro. It has been recorded from elevations of 1,457–1,785 m (4,780–5,856 ft).
