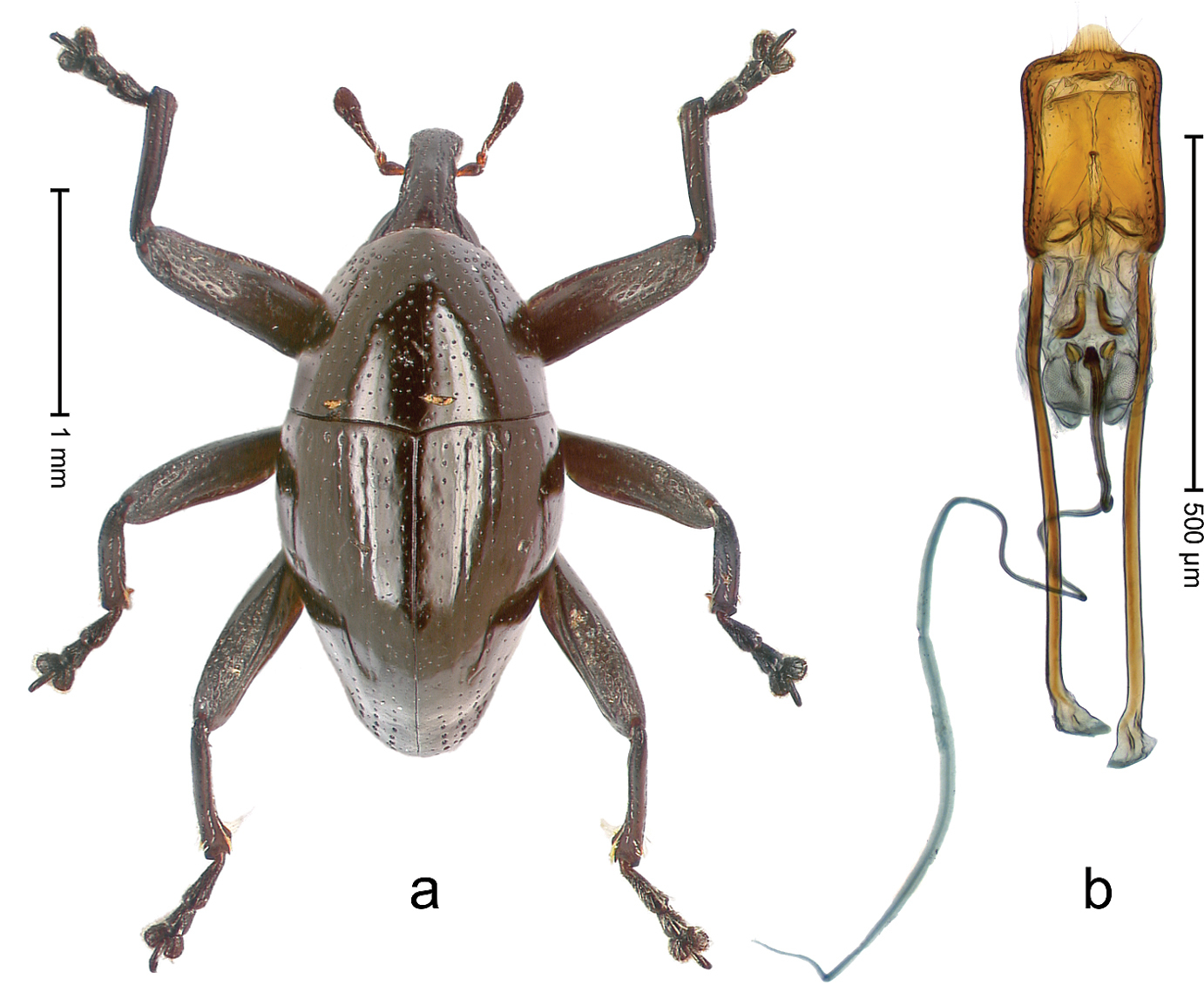

Scientific classification
- Kingdom: Animalia
- Phylum: Arthropoda
- Class: Insecta
- Order: Coleoptera
- Suborder: Polyphaga
- Infraorder: Cucujiformia
- Family: Curculionidae
- Genus: Trigonopterus
- Species: T. allotopus

Binomial name
- Trigonopterus allotopus Riedel, 2014

= Trigonopterus allotopus =

Species of beetle

Trigonopterus allotopus is a species of flightless weevil in the genus Trigonopterus from Indonesia. The species was described in 2014. The beetle is 2.40 mm long. It has a wholly black body with reddish-brown antennae. Endemic to the island of Sumbawa in Indonesia, where it is known from Mount Batu Pasak at an elevation of 1,305 m (4,281 ft).

== Taxonomy ==
Trigonopterus allotopus was described by the entomologist Alexander Riedel in 2014 on the basis of an adult male specimen collected from Mount Batu Pasak on the island of Sumbawa in Indonesia. The specific epithet is derived from the Latinized forms of the Greek words allos, meaning "foreign", and topos, meaning "place". The name was chosen because T. allotopus is the most south-western of the species in the T. politus group.

== Description ==
The beetle is 2.40 mm long. It is black with reddish-brown antennae. The body is ovate and lacks a noticeable constriction between the pronotum and elytron; in profile, it is evenly convex. The rostrum is punctate and slightly wrinkled. The eyes have a furrow along the upper margin that continues into the forehead, which is not ridged.

The pronotum is mostly smooth, with sparse punctures. The elytra are also mostly smooth, with striae barely visible, marked only by a few deeper punctures near the base and apex. The femora are finely textured and punctate. The metafemur has a ridge along the lower rear edge and a longitudinal groove on the back surface, with a smooth upper rear edge and no stridulatory patch. The mesotibia is rounded at the base and has both an uncus and a larger premucro near the tip. The metatibia has a fringe of curved white setae near the tip, along with an uncus but no premucro. Abdominal ventrite 2 is swollen, with its rear edge projecting and forming a shared cavity with ventrite 1. Ventrite 5 is dull, finely textured, and punctate, with a shallow depression near the tip.

The penis is short and slender, with nearly parallel sides and a symmetrical apex that ends in a central triangular extension. The transfer apparatus is dentiform and bordered at the tip by a pair of L-shaped sclerites. The ductus ejaculatorius has no distinct bulbus.

== Distribution ==
Trigonopterus allotopus is endemic to the island of Sumbawa in the Indonesian province of West Nusa Tenggara, where it is known from near Batu Dulang village on Mount Batu Pasak. It has been recorded from an elevation of 1,305 m (4,281 ft). Specimens of the species were collected from leaf litter, but the beetle is thought to live on foliage based on the behaviour of other closely related species.
