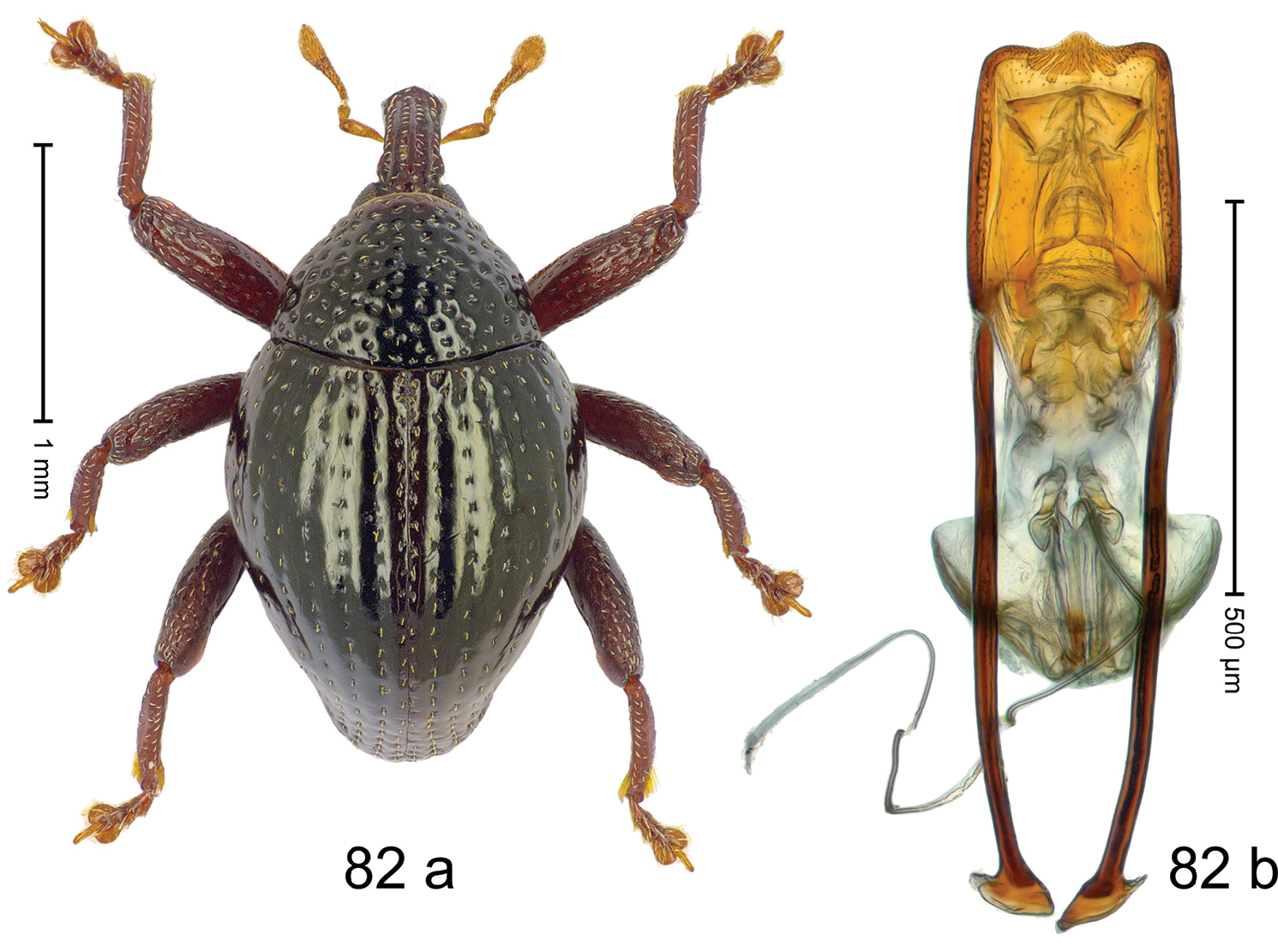

Scientific classification
- Kingdom: Animalia
- Phylum: Arthropoda
- Clade: Pancrustacea
- Class: Insecta
- Order: Coleoptera
- Suborder: Polyphaga
- Infraorder: Cucujiformia
- Family: Curculionidae
- Genus: Trigonopterus
- Species: T. sampunensis

Binomial name
- Trigonopterus sampunensis Riedel, 2019

= Trigonopterus sampunensis =

Species of beetle

Trigonopterus sampunensis is a species of flightless weevil in the genus Trigonopterus from Indonesia. The species was described in May 2019 and is named after Mount Sampuna in South Sulawesi, Indonesia, where the species was first collected. The beetle is 2.04–2.50 mm long. Its antennae are reddish-brown and the legs and head are a darker shade of reddish brown. The rest of the body is black. Endemic to South Sulawesi, where it is found in leaf litter of montane forests at elevations of approximately 1100 m.

== Taxonomy ==
Trigonopterus sampunensis was described by the entomologist Alexander Riedel in 2019 on the basis of an adult male specimen collected from Mount Sampuna in South Sulawesi, Indonesia. The species is named after the type locality.

== Description ==
The beetle is 2.04–2.50 mm long. Its antennae are reddish-brown and the legs and head are a darker shade of reddish brown. The rest of the body is black. The body is somewhat oval and appears convex when viewed from the side. The rostrum has a central ridge and two submedian ridges, with the grooves between them containing sparse rows of setae. At the back of the epistome, there is a transverse ridge.

The pronotum is densely covered with punctures, and the spaces between them are nearly smooth and about the same size as the punctures themselves. A smooth, unpunctured line runs down the center. The elytra have striae marked by small punctures, with slightly larger punctures on stria 8 near the humerus. The suture is bordered by a row of small punctures, and the spaces between the grooves are mostly smooth.

The middle and hind femora have ridges on the underside that end in small blunt teeth. The hind femur also has a simple edge on the upper rear side and is sparsely covered with upright, transparent scales. Near the tip, it features a stridulatory patch used to make sound. The first two abdominal ventrites are slightly sunken, mostly smooth, and have a fine mesh-like texture (microreticulate). The second ventrite has a flange on the side that projects outward at an angle. The fifth ventrite is also mostly smooth, with a few punctures and a round pit in the center.

In males, the penis has nearly parallel sides and a blunt tip with a short central extension. The apodemes are 2.9 times the length of the penis. The transfer apparatus is flagelliform, directed backward when at rest, and about the same length as the penis. The ductus ejaculatorius lacks a clearly defined bulb.

== Distribution ==
Found in leaf litter of montane forests in South Sulawesi, at elevations of approximately 1100 m.
