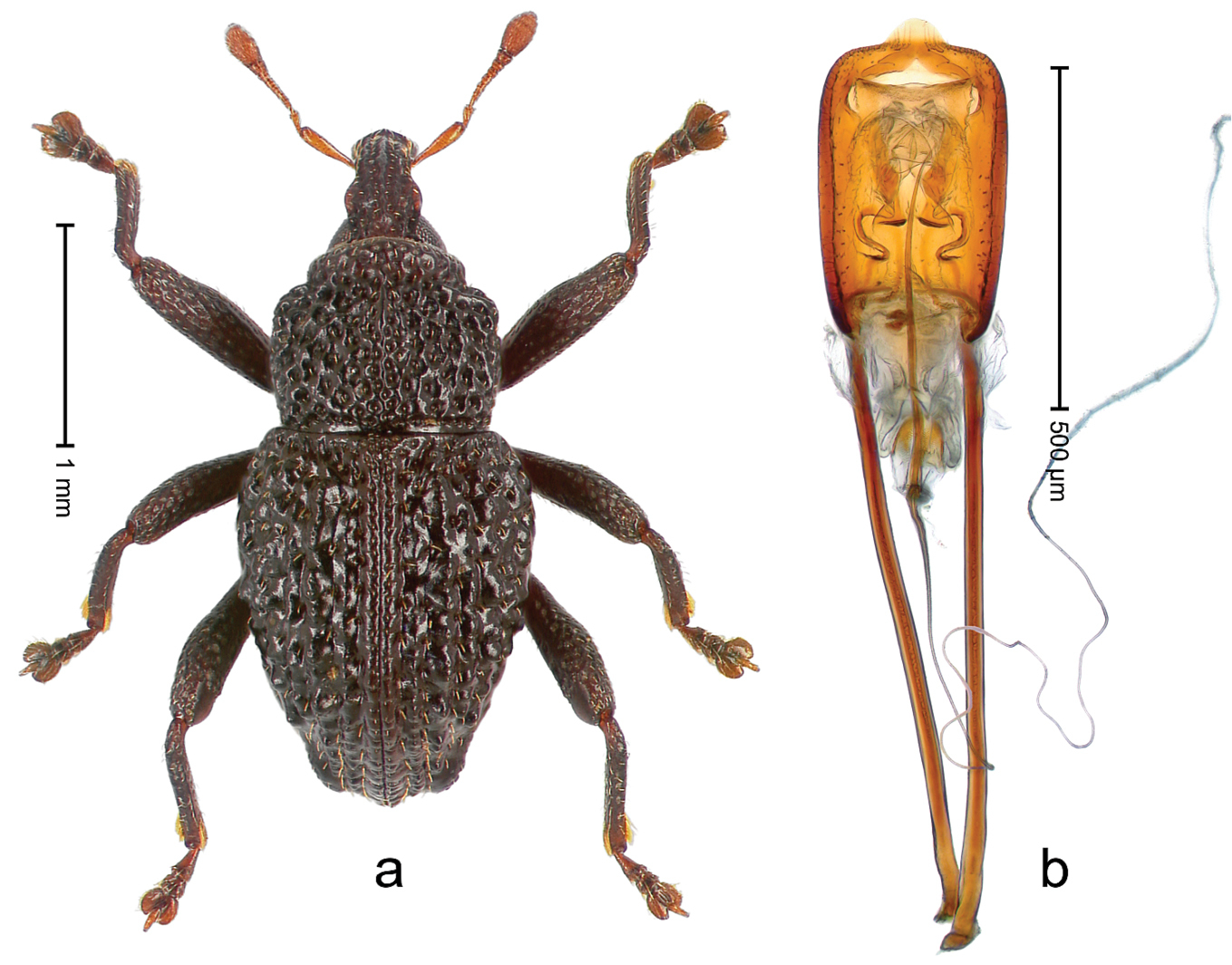

Scientific classification
- Kingdom: Animalia
- Phylum: Arthropoda
- Clade: Pancrustacea
- Class: Insecta
- Order: Coleoptera
- Suborder: Polyphaga
- Infraorder: Cucujiformia
- Family: Curculionidae
- Genus: Trigonopterus
- Species: T. asper

Binomial name
- Trigonopterus asper Riedel, 2014

= Trigonopterus asper =

Species of beetle

Trigonopterus asper is a species of flightless weevil in the genus Trigonopterus from Indonesia. The species was described in 2014 and is named after the uneven texture of its integument. The beetle is 2.48–2.60 mm long. It has a reddish-brown head and legs, while the rest of the body is black. Endemic to West Java, where it is known only from Mount Bukittinggul at elevations of 1,983–2,185 m (6,506–7,169 ft).

== Taxonomy ==
Trigonopterus asper was described by the entomologist Alexander Riedel in 2014 on the basis of an adult male specimen collected from Mount Bukittinggul on the island of Java in Indonesia. The specific epithet is derived from Latin asper, meaning "coarse" or "rough", referring to the uneven texture of its integument. T. asper is closely related to T. variolosus. It can be distinguished from the latter by its larger penis with a larger flagella.

== Description ==
The beetle is 2.48–2.60 mm long. It has a reddish-brown head and legs, with the rest of the body being black. The body is elongated, with a pronounced constriction between the pronotum and elytron when viewed from above, and a distinct narrowing also visible in profile. The rostrum is coarsely wrinkled and punctured, featuring a median ridge and a pair of irregular submedian ridges. The epistome has a faint, angled transverse ridge.

The pronotum narrows clearly near the tip and projects slightly at the front. Its surface is rough, with each puncture bearing an erect seta, and a central ridge runs along the middle. The elytra have deeply impressed striae, each lined with stout, suberect bristles. The intervals are tuberculate, mostly bare, with the sutural interval extending slightly at the apex. Interval 7 is swollen near the tip and projects weakly outward. The femora are edentate. The metafemur has a stridulatory patch near the tip. Abdominal ventrite 5 is flat, densely punctured, and covered with setae.

The penis is flattened and strongly curved in profile, with nearly parallel sides from above. The apex has a central, triangular extension. The transfer apparatus is flagelliform and 1.5 times the length of the penis body. The apodemes are 2.6 times as long, and the ductus ejaculatorius lacks a bulbus.

In females, the rostrum has pairs of lateral and submedian grooves on the upper surface, and the epistome is simple.

== Distribution ==
Trigonopterus asper is endemic to the Indonesian province of West Java, where it is known only from Mount Bukittinggul. It has been recorded from elevations of 1,983–2,185 m (6,506–7,169 ft).
