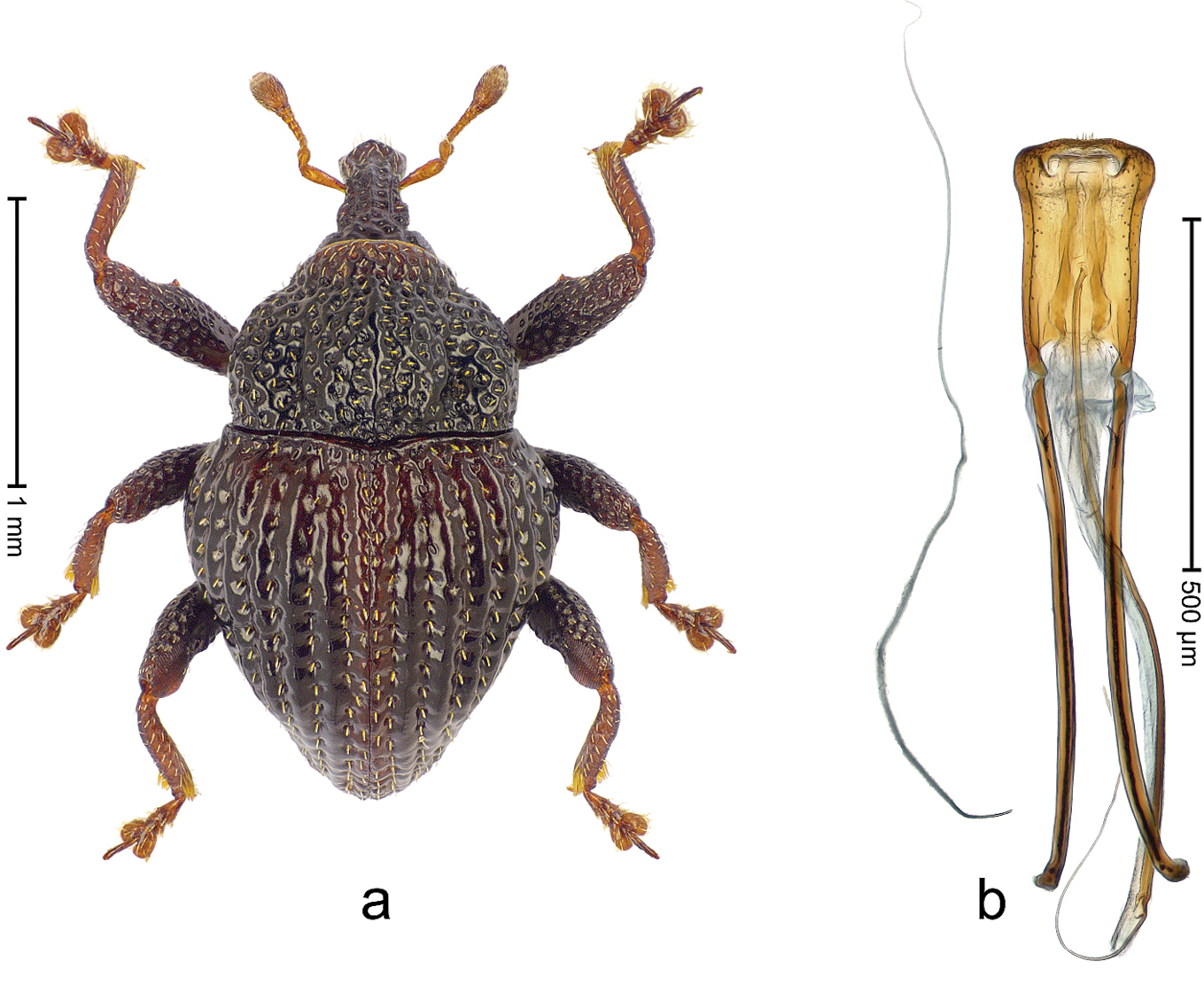
- Holotype specimen and penis

Scientific classification
- Kingdom: Animalia
- Phylum: Arthropoda
- Class: Insecta
- Order: Coleoptera
- Suborder: Polyphaga
- Infraorder: Cucujiformia
- Family: Curculionidae
- Genus: Trigonopterus
- Species: T. parasumbawensis

Binomial name
- Trigonopterus parasumbawensis Riedel, 2014

= Trigonopterus parasumbawensis =

Species of beetle

Trigonopterus parasumbawensis is a species of flightless weevil in the genus Trigonopterus from Indonesia.

== Etymology ==
The specific name is derived from the Greek word para-, meaning "next to" or "beside", combined with the specific name of the related species T. sumbawensis.

== Description ==
Individuals measure 1.56–1.90 mm in length. General coloration is black, with dark rust-colored elytra and rust-colored antennae, tibiae, and tarsi.

== Range ==
The species is found around elevations of 1,385 metres (4,544 ft) in Batu Dulang on the island of Sumbawa, part of the Indonesian province of West Nusa Tenggara.

== Phylogeny ==
T. parasumbawensis is part of the T. relictus species group.
