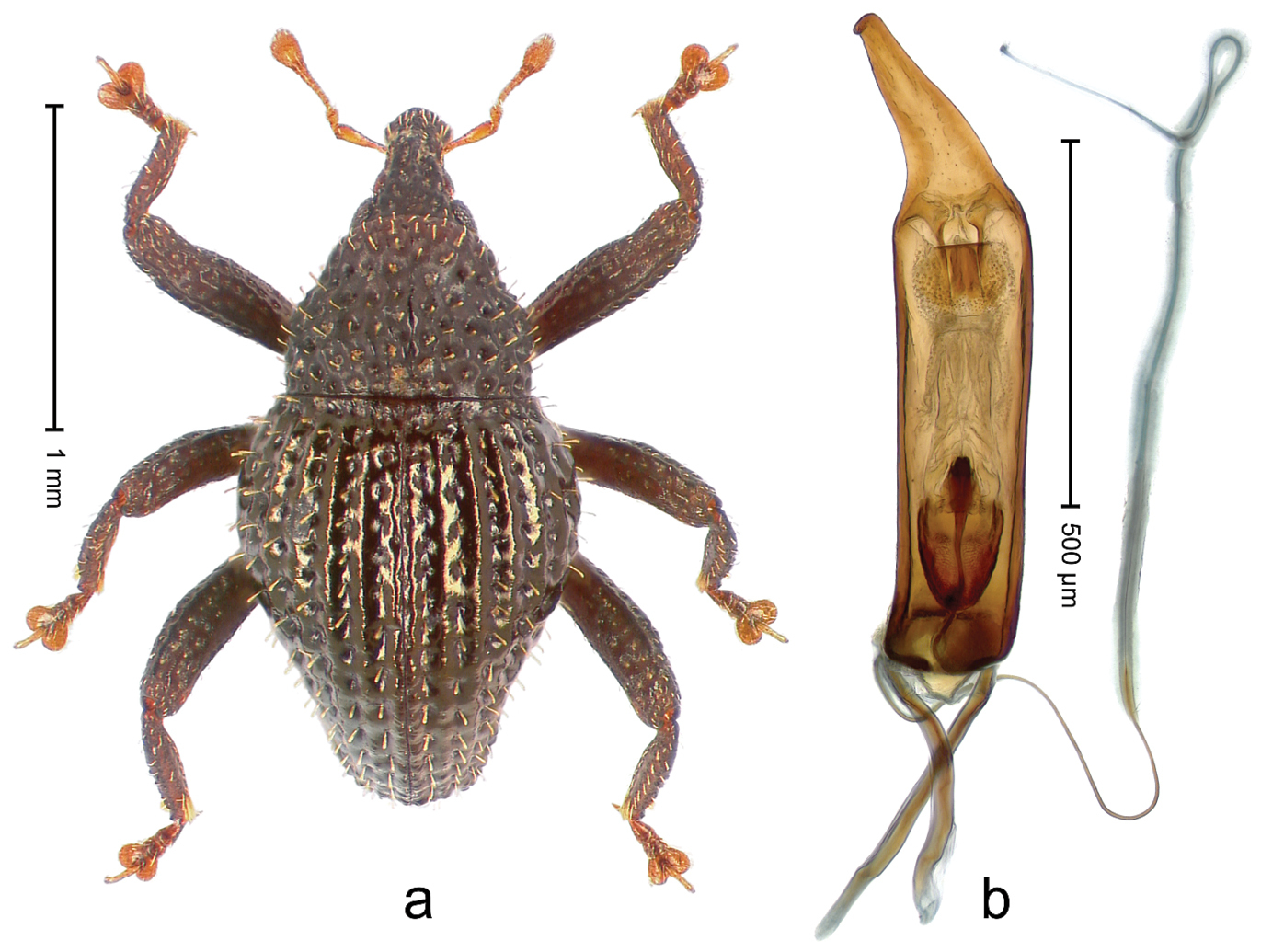

Scientific classification
- Kingdom: Animalia
- Phylum: Arthropoda
- Clade: Pancrustacea
- Class: Insecta
- Order: Coleoptera
- Suborder: Polyphaga
- Infraorder: Cucujiformia
- Family: Curculionidae
- Genus: Trigonopterus
- Species: T. echinatus

Binomial name
- Trigonopterus echinatus Riedel, 2014

= Trigonopterus echinatus =

Species of beetle

Trigonopterus echinatus is a species of flightless weevil in the genus Trigonopterus from Indonesia.

== Etymology ==
The specific name is derived from the Latin word echinatus, meaning "prickly". It refers to the species' spiny scales.

== Description ==
Individuals measure 1.72–2.04 mm in length. Body is slightly oval in shape. General coloration black, dull on the pronotum and with a bronze tint on the elytra, head and legs rust-colored. The elytra is patterned with deep punctures, each accompanied by a spine-like scale.

== Range ==
The species is found around elevations of 990–1,314 metres (3,248–4,311 ft) on Mount Payung and Mount Sawal in the Indonesian province of West Java.
