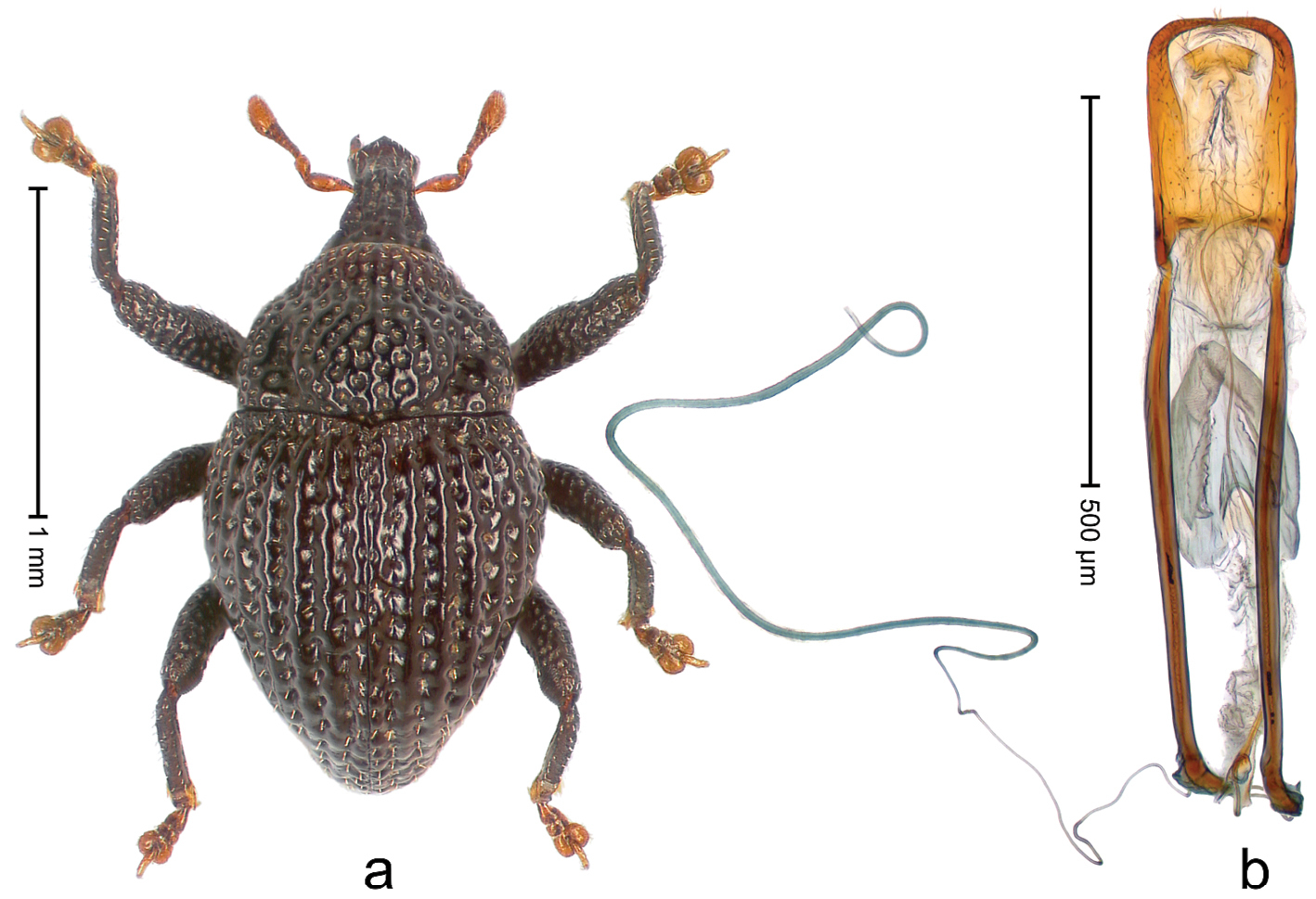
- Holotype specimen and penis

Scientific classification
- Kingdom: Animalia
- Phylum: Arthropoda
- Class: Insecta
- Order: Coleoptera
- Suborder: Polyphaga
- Infraorder: Cucujiformia
- Family: Curculionidae
- Genus: Trigonopterus
- Species: T. pauxillus

Binomial name
- Trigonopterus pauxillus Riedel, 2014

= Trigonopterus pauxillus =

Species of beetle

Trigonopterus pauxillus is a species of flightless weevil in the genus Trigonopterus from Indonesia.

== Etymology ==
The specific name is derived from the Latin word pauxillus, meaning "small". It refers to the species small size.

== Description ==
Individuals measure 1.65–2.01 mm in length. General coloration black, with rust-colored tarsi and antennae.

== Range ==
The species is found around elevations of 1,280–1,490 metres (4,200–4,890 ft) around Batu Dulang and Tepal on the island of Sumbawa, part of the Indonesian province of West Nusa Tenggara.

== Phylogeny ==
T. pauxillus is part of the T. relictus species group.
