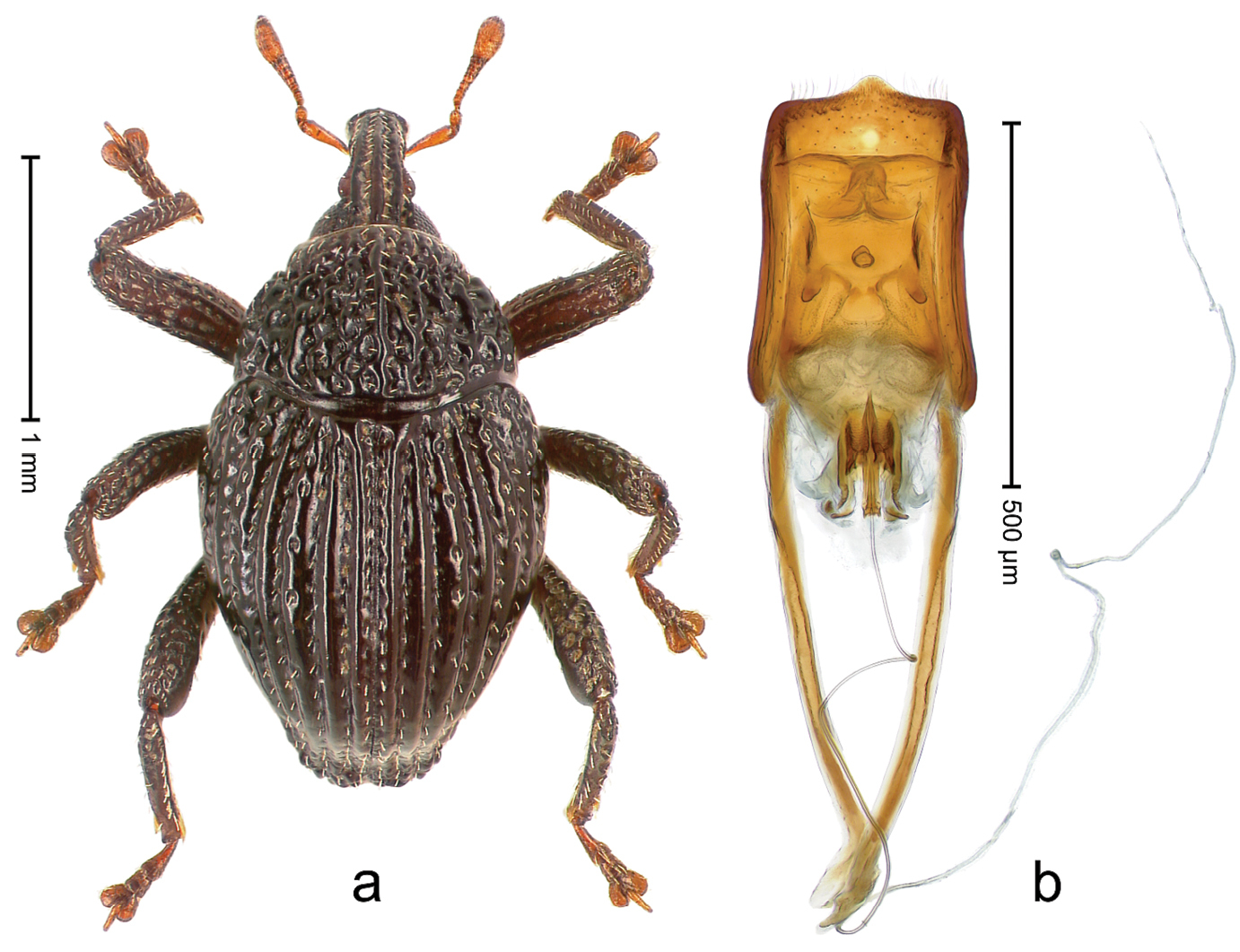
- Holotype specimen and penis

Scientific classification
- Kingdom: Animalia
- Phylum: Arthropoda
- Class: Insecta
- Order: Coleoptera
- Suborder: Polyphaga
- Infraorder: Cucujiformia
- Family: Curculionidae
- Genus: Trigonopterus
- Species: T. pararugosus

Binomial name
- Trigonopterus pararugosus Riedel, 2014

= Trigonopterus pararugosus =

Species of beetle

Trigonopterus pararugosus is a species of flightless weevil in the genus Trigonopterus from Indonesia.

== Etymology ==
The specific name is derived from the Greek word para-, meaning "next to", combined with the specific name of the related species T. rugosus.

== Description ==
Individuals measure 2.16–2.38 mm in length. Body is slightly oval in shape. General coloration is black, with rust-colored antennae and legs.

== Range ==
The species is found around elevations of 825–1,520 metres (2,707–4,987 ft) on Mount Batukaru, Mount Mesehe, and Tamblingan on the Indonesian island province of Bali.

== Phylogeny ==
T. pararugosus is part of the T. saltator species group.
