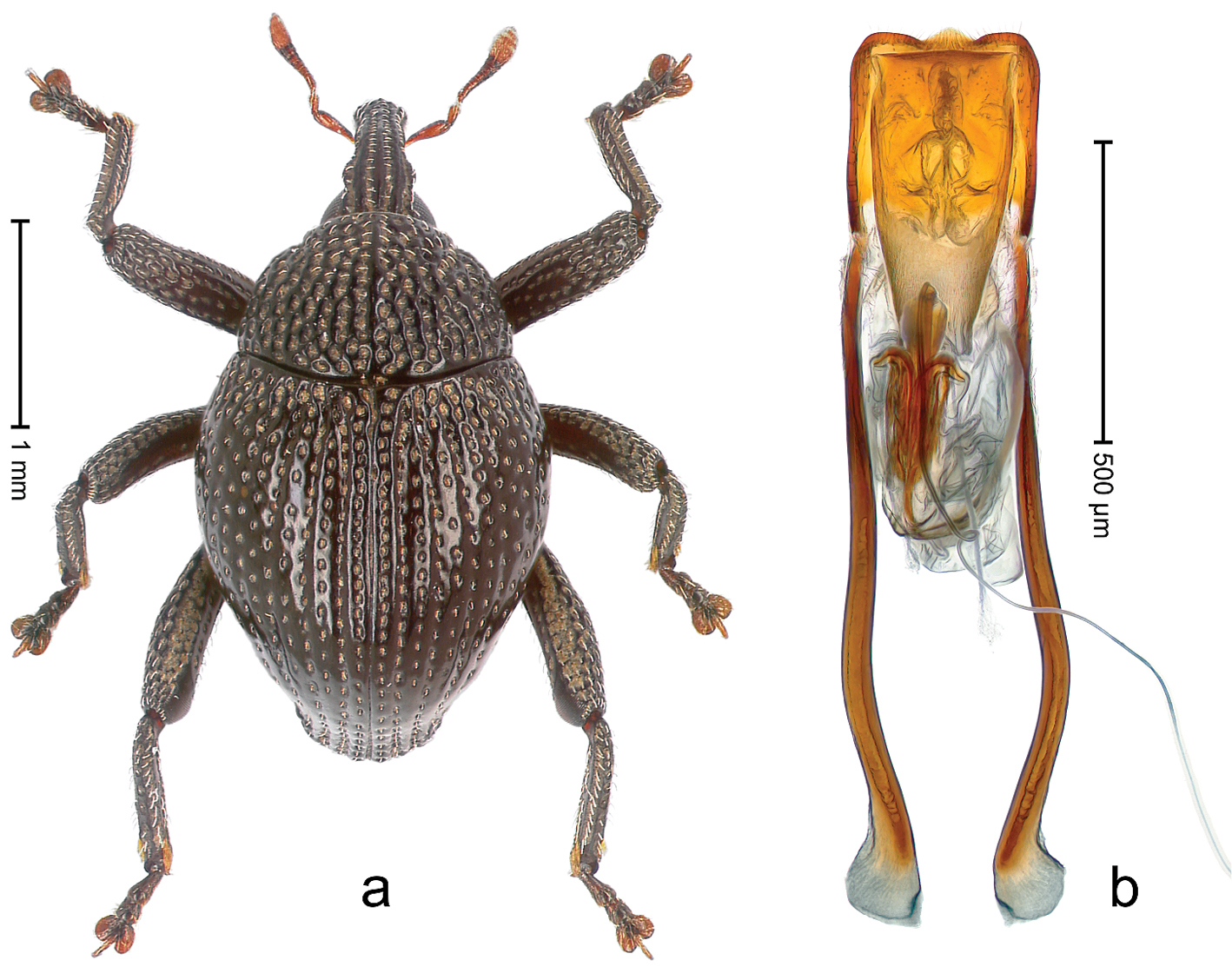
- Holotype specimen and penis

Scientific classification
- Kingdom: Animalia
- Phylum: Arthropoda
- Class: Insecta
- Order: Coleoptera
- Suborder: Polyphaga
- Infraorder: Cucujiformia
- Family: Curculionidae
- Genus: Trigonopterus
- Species: T. mesehensis

Binomial name
- Trigonopterus mesehensis Riedel, 2014

= Trigonopterus mesehensis =

Species of beetle

Trigonopterus mesehensis is a species of flightless weevil in the genus Trigonopterus from Indonesia.

== Etymology ==
The specific name is derived from that of the type locality.

== Description ==
Individuals measure 2.11–2.88 mm in length. Body is slightly oval in shape. General coloration is black, with rust-colored antennae and dark rust-colored legs.

== Range ==
The species is found around elevations of 460–840 metres (1,510–2,760 ft) on Mount Mesehe on the Indonesian island province of Bali.

== Phylogeny ==
T. mesehensis is part of the T. saltator species group.
