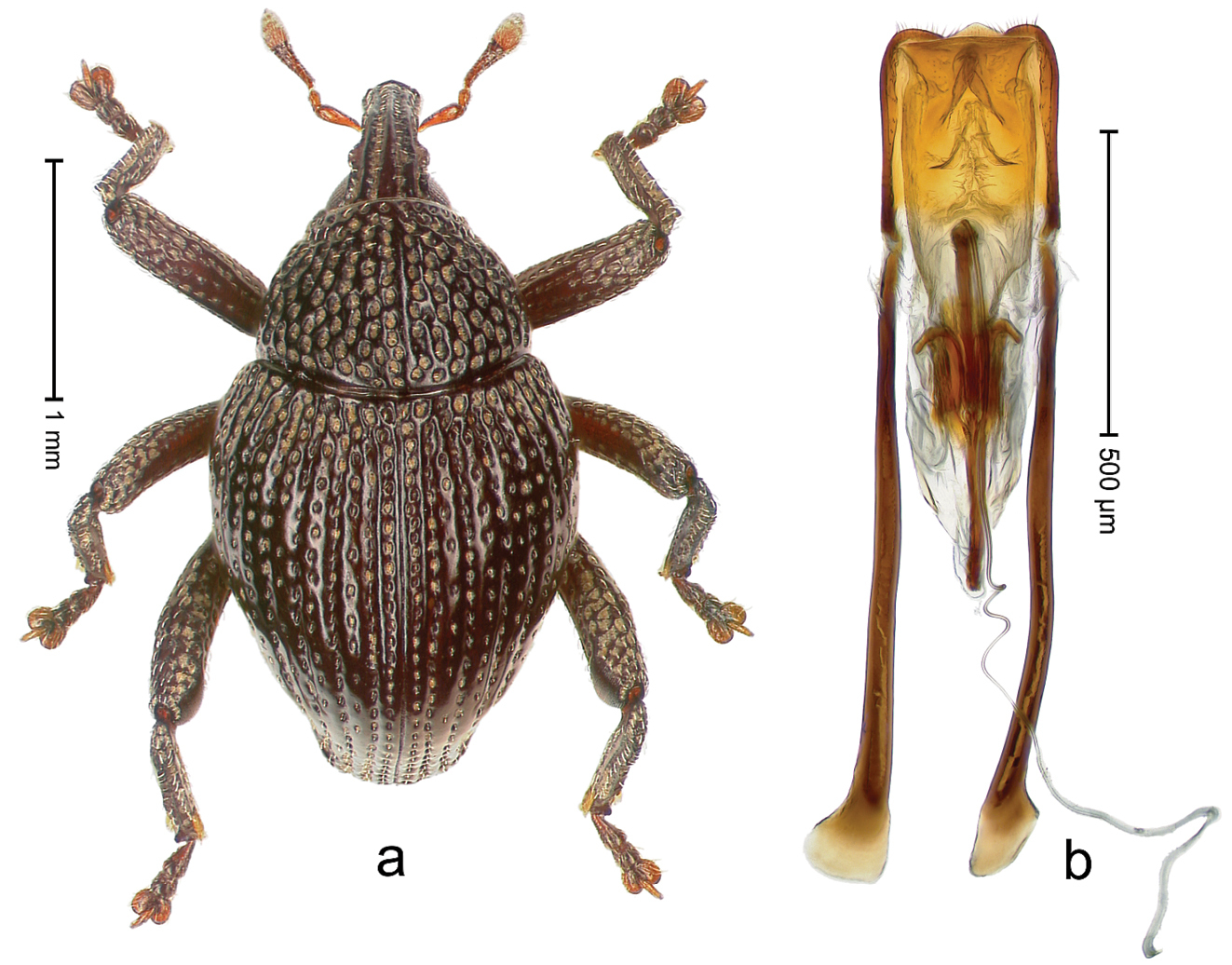

Scientific classification
- Kingdom: Animalia
- Phylum: Arthropoda
- Class: Insecta
- Order: Coleoptera
- Suborder: Polyphaga
- Infraorder: Cucujiformia
- Family: Curculionidae
- Genus: Trigonopterus
- Species: T. klatakanensis

Binomial name
- Trigonopterus klatakanensis Riedel, 2014

= Trigonopterus klatakanensis =

Species of beetle

Trigonopterus klatakanensis is a species of flightless weevil in the genus Trigonopterus from Indonesia.

== Etymology ==
The specific name is derived from that of the type locality.

== Description ==
Individuals measure 2.22–2.53 mm in length. The body is slightly oval in shape. General coloration is a dark rust-color, except for the legs and head, which are rust-colored.

== Range ==
The species is found around elevations of 500–600 metres (1,600–2,000 ft) on Mount Klatakan on the Indonesian island province of Bali.

== Phylogeny ==
T. klatakanensis is part of the T. saltator species group.
