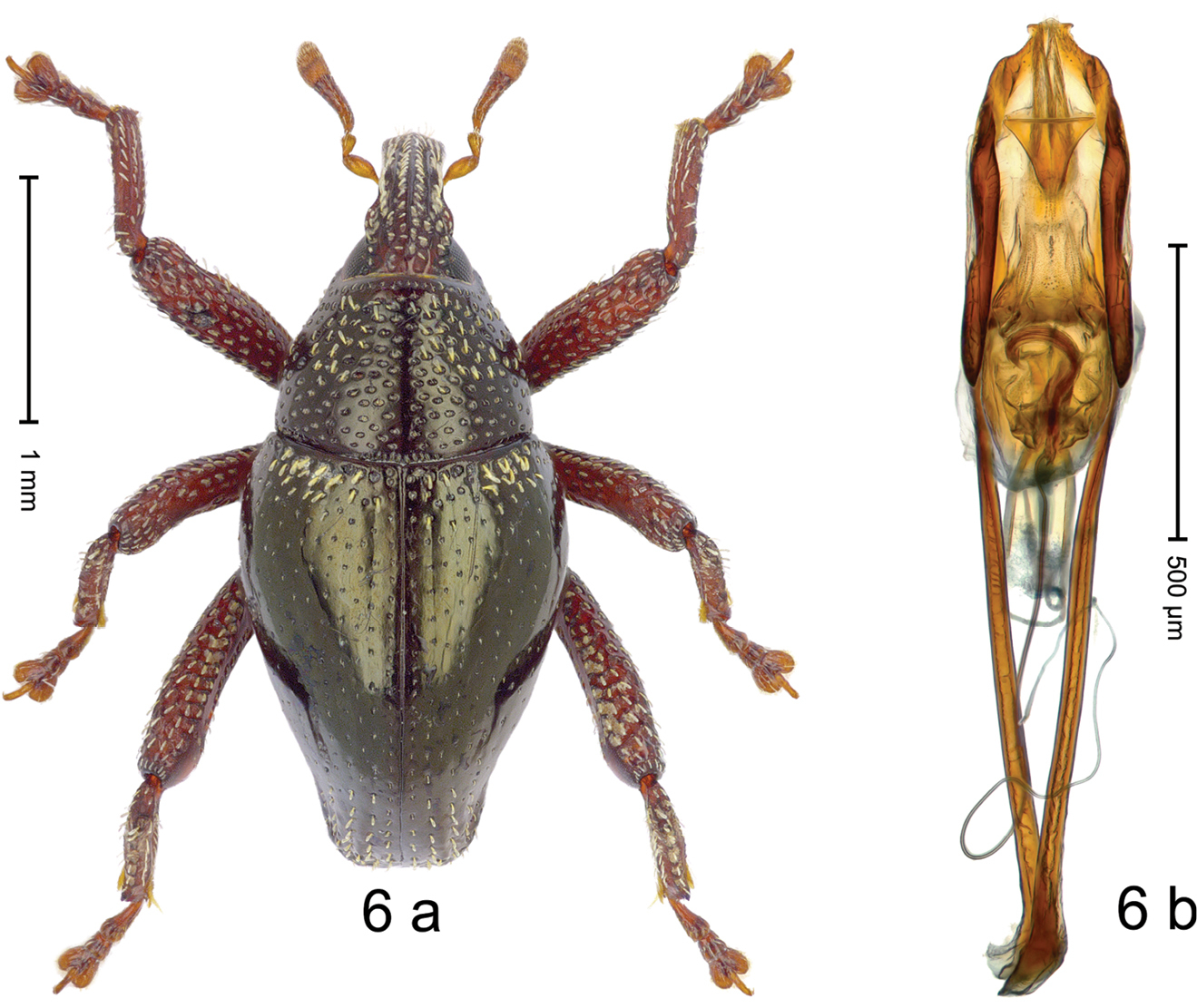

Scientific classification
- Kingdom: Animalia
- Phylum: Arthropoda
- Clade: Pancrustacea
- Class: Insecta
- Order: Coleoptera
- Suborder: Polyphaga
- Infraorder: Cucujiformia
- Family: Curculionidae
- Genus: Trigonopterus
- Species: T. analis

Binomial name
- Trigonopterus analis Riedel, 2019

= Trigonopterus analis =

Species of beetle

Trigonopterus analis is a species of flightless weevil in the genus Trigonopterus from Indonesia.

== Description ==
The species is endemic to Sulawesi in Indonesia. The species was described in May 2019.
