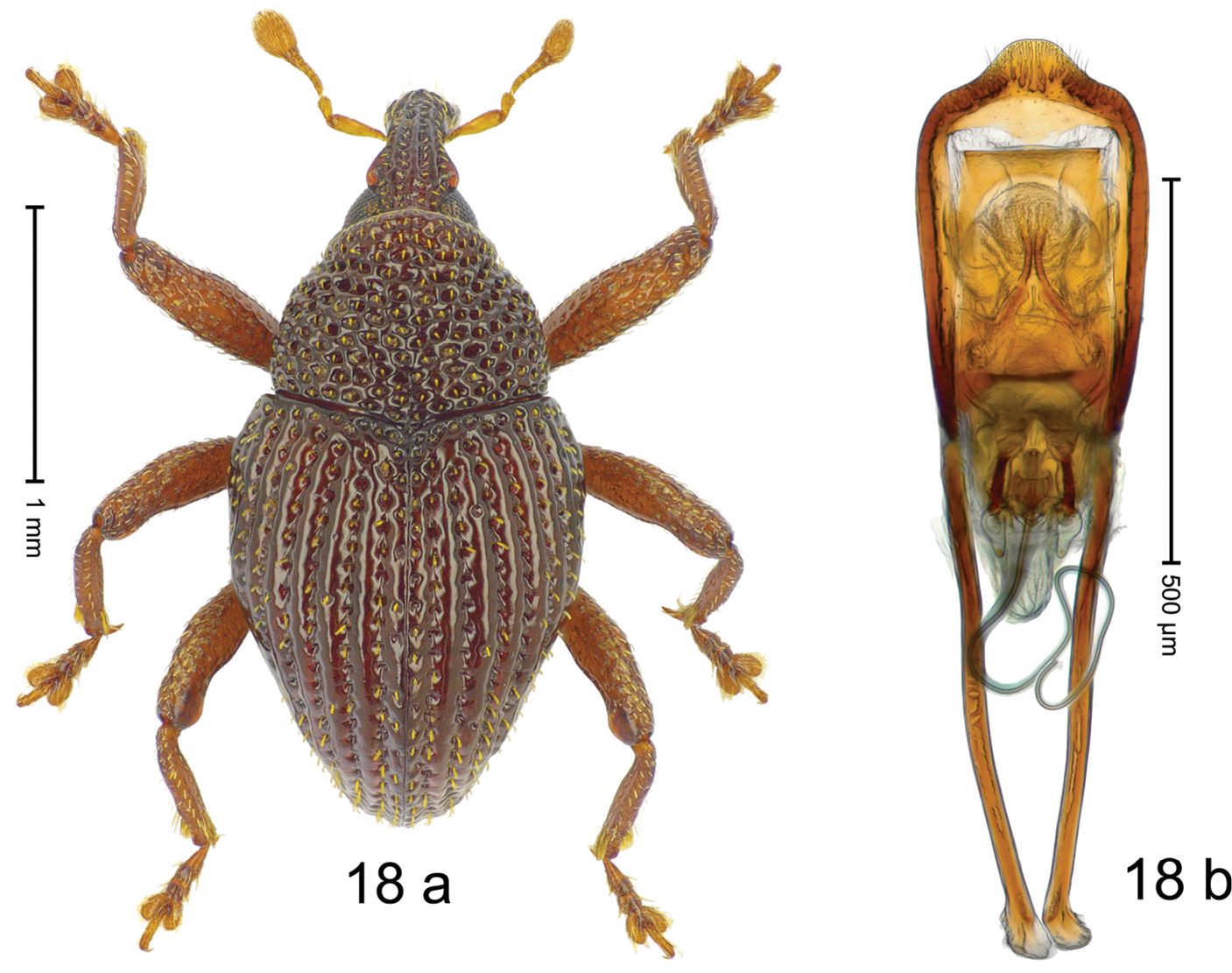

Scientific classification
- Kingdom: Animalia
- Phylum: Arthropoda
- Clade: Pancrustacea
- Class: Insecta
- Order: Coleoptera
- Suborder: Polyphaga
- Infraorder: Cucujiformia
- Family: Curculionidae
- Genus: Trigonopterus
- Species: T. costatulus

Binomial name
- Trigonopterus costatulus Riedel, 2019

= Trigonopterus costatulus =

Species of beetle

Trigonopterus costatulus is a species of flightless weevil in the genus Trigonopterus from Indonesia.

== Description ==
This species is endemic to Sulawesi in Indonesia and was described in May 2019.
