= Farhad Hafezi =

Swiss eye surgeon and researcher (born 1967)

Farhad Hafezi MD, PhD, FARVO
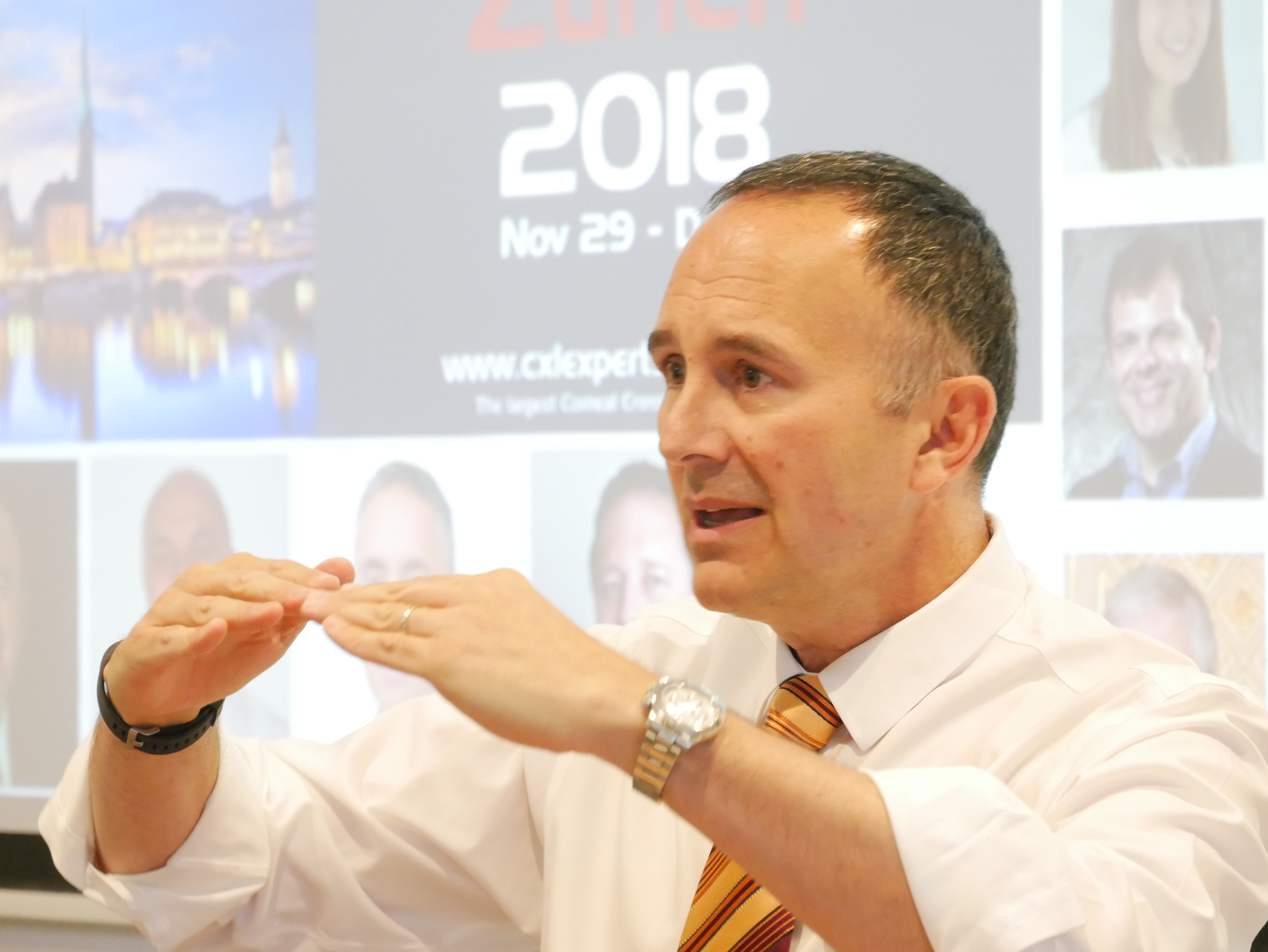
- Born: November 1, 1967 (age 58); Remscheid, Germany
- Education: MD, PhD
- Occupations: Ophthalmologist, clinical researcher
- Children: 3
- Medical career
- Institutions: Universität Zürich, Universität Genf, Keck School of Medicine of USC, ELZA Institute
- Sub-specialties: Refractive surgery, corneal collagen cross-linking, keratoconus
- Research: Cornea, cell biology, keratoconus, refractive surgery
- Notable works: Corneal collagen cross-linking, Complicated case management, corneal biomechanics
- Awards: Achievement Award, American Academy of Ophthalmology; Casebeer Award, International Society of Refractive Surgery, American Academy of Ophthalmology; Gold Medal, Intraocular Implant and Refractive Society of India (IIRSI); Carl Camras Translational Research Award by the ARVO Foundation, USA; Appointed FARVO (Fellow of ARVO), 2019
- Website: www.elza-institute.com

Farhad Hafezi (born 1 November 1967) is a Swiss eye surgeon and researcher. Hafezi first gained recognition as a leading retina researcher in 1994, having been the first to discover a gene responsible for light-induced retinal degeneration. However, he changed his research focus to the cornea in 2003, and it is this work, particularly on corneal collagen cross-linking (CXL), which he helped pioneer, and advanced laser refractive surgery that he is internationally known for today. Hafezi's current clinical and laboratory research is focused on gaining a better understanding of the cornea. His research group at the University of Zurich has three main research foci:

- Examining the structure and function of the cornea at the molecular level,
- Investigating corneal cell biology, and
- Translational research initiatives dedicated to improving laser refractive surgery techniques that can help address certain complications that can arise following these procedures.

Hafezi is considered to be a leading expert and key opinion leader in the development and translation of CXL and its multiple applications in the field of ophthalmology, including the treatment of corneal ectatic disorders like keratoconus, pellucid marginal degeneration and post-LASIK ectasia. Hafezi and his colleagues have also pioneered the use of CXL for the treatment of corneal infections, calling the technique "photoactivated chromophore for infectious keratitis cross-linking", or PACK-CXL. Hafezi has published almost 200 articles in various peer-reviewed scientific journals since 1993, including Nature Medicine, Nature Genetics, Investigative Ophthalmology & Visual Science (IOVS), the Journal of Refractive Surgery, and Cell Death & Differentiation.

His work in the field of corneal collagen cross-linking has led him to receive a number of international awards. In 2014, 2016, 2018, 2020, 2023, 2025, and 2026 his peers ranked Hafezi as one of the top 100 most influential people in ophthalmology.

He is currently a professor of ophthalmology at the University of Geneva, an adjunct clinical professor of ophthalmology at the Keck School of Medicine, University of Southern California, a research group leader of the Ocular Cell Biology Group at the Center for Applied Biotechnology and Molecular Medicine at the University of Zurich, a visiting professor at the University of Wenzhou, China, a research professor of ophthalmology at the NYU Grossman School of Medicine, and medical director of the ELZA Institute.

== Early life and research ==
Hafezi was born in Remscheid, Germany in 1967, but he moved to Fribourg in Switzerland in 1981. He studied medicine in Fribourg and Bern, obtaining his Doctorate of Medicine at the Inselspital Bern under Prof. Dr. med Peter Weidmann, before going on in 1993, to undertake a two-year postgraduate course in Experimental Medicine and Biology at the University of Zürich. Hafezi spent three additional years at the University Hospital of Zurich, where he worked in the Laboratory for Retinal Cell Biology, which was part of the Department of Ophthalmology. Whilst studying in the Zürich laboratory, Hafezi identified the first known gene, c-Fos, that the absence of which could completely suppress light-induced apoptotic retinal degeneration. The group's findings were featured on the cover of the April 1997 edition of Nature Medicine.

Hafezi then focused on a number of areas of cellular and retinal degeneration, in particular, light-induced photoreceptor death in the absence of p53 and JunD/AP-1, work that was published in IOVS and Cell Death & Differentiation, respectively. c-Fos and Fra1 are both components of the transcription factor AP-1, and in the year 2000, Hafezi and his colleagues presented work that showed that, in genetically engineered mice that express Fra1 where c-Fos is usually expressed, Fra1 can function in lieu of c-Fos to promote light-induced retinal photoreceptor death – work that was published in Genes & Development. That same year, Hafezi was part of a research group that identified the visual cycle enzyme RPE65 as essential component of light-induced retinal degeneration. The article was published in Nature Genetics.

In 2001, his work investigating the molecular pathways that underpin light-induced retinal photoreceptor apoptosis continued with a paper published in Cell Death & Differentiation showing that AP-1 mediated retinal photoreceptor apoptosis was independent of N-terminal phosphorylation of one of its components, c-Jun. Later that year, he and a team of researchers utilized a mouse strain with a single base change in codon 450 of the RPE65 gene (the Leu450Met variation) in which RPE65 regenerates rhodopsin at a far slower rate than wild-type animals; this mutation was observed to increase retinal resistance against light-induced degeneration, and demonstrating that the light damage susceptibility of the retina is tied to rhodopsin regeneration kinetics.

== Corneal cross-linking ==
In 2002, Hafezi's clinical and research interests turned to the cornea. He became a corneal specialist, and his work helped develop the principles of corneal collagen cross-linking (CXL) and translate CXL from a laboratory into a clinical setting, initially for the treatment of keratoconus. Hafezi's combination of basic science knowledge combined with clinical, surgical experience of CXL has led him to become one of the world's leading experts on both keratoconus and cross-linking technology. The impact of CXL on the treatment of keratoconus is hard to underestimate: today, CXL considered to be the treatment of choice for progressive keratoconus and corneal ectasias, reducing the need for corneal transplantation by half.

Hafezi continued to work to expand the number of people who could benefit from CXL. Briefly, the original CXL method, termed the Dresden Protocol, involves removing the central 8–10 mm of the corneal epithelium of adult patients with corneas thicker than 400 μm, and applying 0.1% riboflavin solution to the cornea for 30 minutes before, and at 5-minute intervals during 365 nm UV-A irradiation of the corneal surface at an irradiance of 3 mW/cm^{2}. Hafezi has helped push the boundaries, pioneering CXL in children with keratoconus, the use of hypoosmolar riboflavin solutions to treat people with thin (≤400 μm) corneas. and using CXL to treat post-LASIK ectasia. The knowledge Hafezi accrued from this work led to him becoming a leading international expert on corneal ectasia in general and keratoconus in particular. His expertise in treating children with keratoconus using CXL has led to his involvement in shaping safety standards and best practice models for treatment. Hafezi has implemented other CXL treatments in more recent times. The keratoconus treatment via pediatric application and also using CXL principles for treating infectious keratitis. Hafezi also hold two medical patents, both related to CXL technology and treatments.

== Media and recognition ==
Hafezi has won a number of international awards due to his contributions in the advancement of CXL technology and its applications, including:

- Keratoconus Global Award (2009) for his work on CXL technology.
- Carl Camras Award 2014 for translational research (Association for Research in Vision and Ophthalmology [ARVO])
- The 2014 IIRSI Gold Medal for his efforts in introducing CXL into clinical ophthalmology
- Member of The Ophthalmologist Power List Top 100 (2014, 2016, 2018, 2020, and 2023)
- Casebeer Award (2014) of the International Society for Refractive Surgery.
- The 2016 El-Maghraby International Award for his contributions to ophthalmology
- The 2016 Gold Medal of SAMIR for his pioneering work on corneal cross-linking
- Elected as an honorary member of Hungary's SHIOL (Societas Hungarica Ad Implantandam Oculi Lenticulam) in 2016
- Appointed FARVO (Fellow of ARVO) in 2019

Additionally, in 2012, Hafezi and his colleague, Dr. Olivier Richoz, won the University of Geneva's INNOGAP award for the development of a disposable medical device (the C-Eye device) for performing PACK-CXL.

Hafezi is one of the most cited ophthalmologists of his generation, with a h index of 45 and a total more than 7,700 citations in the scientific literature.

== Books as editor ==
1. Corneal collagen cross-linking, Randleman B, Hafezi F, Editors. 2013, Slack Inc.: Thorofare, NJ, USA.

== Book chapters ==
1. Richoz O, Hafezi F Modifications for Thin Corneas, in Corneal collagen cross-linking, Randleman B, Hafezi F, Editors. 2013, Slack Inc.: Thorofare, NJ, USA. 51–55.

2. Hafezi F, Mavrakanas N Corneal Collagen Cross-Linking for Postoperative Corneal Ectasia, in Corneal collagen cross-linking, Randleman B, Hafezi F, Editors. 2013, Slack Inc.: Thorofare, NJ, USA. 75–81.

3. Pajic B, Latinovic S, Hafezi F, Pajic-Eggspuehler B, Mrochen M, Fankhauser F Lamellar corneal resection with LDV Crystal line femtosecond laser after penetrating keratoplasty, in Femtosecond laser technology, Gark A, Editor. 2012, Jaypee Brothers: Mumbai.

4. Pajic B, Hafezi F, Pajic-Eggspuehler B, Mrochen M, Mueller J, Pajic D, Fankhauser F Applanation-free femtosecond laser processing of the cornea, in Femtosecond laser technology, Gark A, Editor. 2012, Jaypee Brothers: Mumbai.

5. Iseli HP, Hafezi F, Mrochen M, Seiler T Estado actual de la reticulación del colágeno corneal, in Técnicas de modelado corneal: desde la ortoqueratologia hasta el cross-linking, Cezón Prieto J, Editor. 2009, Sociedad Española de Cirurgia Ocular Implanto-Refractiva: Madrid. 381–86.

6. Hafezi F, Iseli HP, Seiler T Automated anterior lamellar keratoplasty for the management of complications in refractive surgery, in Surgical techniques in anterior and posterior lamellar corneal surgery, John T, Editor. 2005, Slack Inc.: New York. (in press).

7. Mrochen M, Jankov M, Iseli HP, Hafezi F, Seiler T Retinal imaging aberrometry - principles and application of the Tscherning aberrometer, in Wavefront Customized Visual Correction: The Quest for Super Vision II, MacRae S, Krueger RR, Applegate RA, Editors. 2003, Slack Incorporated: New York. 137–43.

8. Hafezi F, Abegg M, Wenzel A, Grimm C, Remé CE Lichtschäden des Auges: ein Überblick, in Risikofaktoren für Augenerkrankungen, Erb C, Flammer J, Editors. 1999, Hans Huber: Bern, Göttingen, Toronto, Seattle. 277–83.

9. Remé CE, Hafezi F, Marti A, Munz K, Reinboth JJ Light damage to retina and pigment epithelium, in The Retinal Pigment Epithelium, current aspects of function and disease, Marmor MF, Wolfensberger T, Editors. 1998, Oxford University Press: Oxford. 563–86.

10. Remé CE, Bush R, Hafezi F, Wenzel A, Grimm C Photostasis and beyond: where adaptation ends, in Photostasis and related phenomena, Williams TP, Thistle AB, Editors. 1998, Plenum Press: New York. 199–206.

11. Hafezi F, Marti A, Steinbach JP, Munz K, Aguzzi A, Remé CE Light-induced retinal degeneration is prevented in mice lacking c-fos, in Degenerative retinal diseases, LaVail MM, Hollyfield JG, Anderson RE, Editors. 1998, Plenum Press: New York. 193–98.

12. Remé CE, Hafezi F, Grimm C, Wenzel A UV- und Lichtschäden des Auges - wie kann man sich schützen?, in Physikalische Therapiemassnahmen in der Dermatologie, Dummer R, Panizzon R, Burg G, Editors. 1997, Blackwell Wissenschaftsverlag: Berlin. 200–09.

13. Hafezi F, Marti A, Munz K, Remé CE Early events in light-induced apoptosis of photoreceptors and pigment epithelium of rats in vivo, in Les Seminaires ophthalmologiques Ipsen. 1997, Editions Irvinn: Paris. 13–17.

14. Reme CE, Weller M, Szczesny P, Munz K, Hafezi F, Reinboth JJ, Clausen M Light-induced apoptosis in the rat retina in vivo: morphological features, threshold and time course, in Degenerative diseases of the retina, Anderson RE, LaVail MM, Hollyfield JG, Editors. 1995, Plenum Press: New York. 19–25.
