= Peter Hersh =

American ophthalmologist

Peter S. Hersh is an American ophthalmologist, researcher, and specialist in LASIK eye surgery, keratoconus, and diseases of the cornea. He co-authored the article in the journal Ophthalmology that presented the results of the study that led to the first approval by the U.S. Food and Drug Administration (FDA) of the excimer laser for the correction of nearsightedness in the United States. Hersh was also medical monitor of the study that led to approval of corneal collagen crosslinking for the treatment of keratoconus. He was the originator, in 2015, of CTAK (corneal tissue addition keratoplasty) for keratoconus, patent holder, and co-developer.

== Life and career ==
Hersh grew up in Maplewood, New Jersey, and graduated from Columbia High School.

Hersh graduated from Princeton University with an A.B. in biochemistry, where he was awarded the Senior Thesis prize for his work on messenger RNA. He received his medical degree (M.D.) from Johns Hopkins University and completed his residency training at Harvard Medical School where he was Chief Resident. He also completed a Fellowship in Cornea and External Disease at Harvard. Afterwards, Hersh remained on the full-time faculty at Harvard.

In 1995 he founded the Cornea and Laser Eye Institute (CLEI) – Hersh Vision Group in New Jersey and serves as its director. He also founded the CLEI Center for Keratoconus in 2001, dedicated to clinical care and research in the corneal disorder, keratoconus. He is a clinical professor at the Rutgers - New Jersey Medical School Institute of Ophthalmology and Visual Science and director of the Institute's Cornea and Refractive Surgery Division and is a Visiting Research Collaborator at Princeton University in the Department of Mechanical and Aerospace Engineering. He is also the Chief Team Ophthalmologist for the NY Jets.

Hersh is a member of the American Ophthalmological Society and has been awarded the Senior Honor Award from the American Academy of Ophthalmology. He is also a past recipient of the Teacher of the Year Award from the Harvard Medical School Residency in Ophthalmology.

== Research ==
Hersh's research is focused on developing new techniques and technologies in refractive and corneal surgery, most particularly for the corneal disorder, keratoconus. He is the originator of CTAK (corneal tissue addition keratoplasty) for keratoconus, patent holder (US11759308B2, US11406531B1), and co-developer. His clinical interests are devoted to treatment of keratoconus, LASIK, femtosecond laser uses in LASIK and other corneal surgeries, LASEK/Photorefractive keratectomy, CK (conductive keratoplasty), and corneal inlays (Intacs) for keratoconus. He authored or co-authored more than 100 research articles and abstracts on these subjects and has written or co-written four textbooks.

Hersh participated in nationwide clinical trials that led to the U.S. FDA's approval of the excimer laser system for the correction of nearsightedness and for the treatment of a variety of corneal diseases in the United States and co-authored the article that presented the results of the study.

Hersh is co-author of a patent regarding the use of short pulsed lasers for corneal surgery (#11/843,498) and is the inventor of a number of surgical instruments used in corneal surgery, such as the Hersh Intralase Flap Spatula and a complete instrument set for the CTAK procedure.

Hersh was one of two investigators to present the conductive keratoplasty (CK) procedure to the FDA device panel. This led to FDA approval of this procedure in 2002. He expanded on these efforts in his thesis for admission to the American Ophthalmological Society entitled "Optics of Conductive Keratoplasty: Implications for Presbyopia Management". He has also devised new applications of this technique to treat optical irregularities of the cornea.

Hersh has done extensive work on corneal collagen cross-linking (CXL), a procedure for decreasing the progression of keratoconus and corneal ectatic disorders, and he has published numerous articles in ophthalmology medical journals analyzing the results of the use of this procedure for keratoconus and ectasia. As of 2013, he was the U.S. medical monitor for the medical device and pharmaceutical company Avedro, which has developed a new technique of cross-linking to manage keratoconus. Hersh was one of 7 principal investigators involved in the Avedro clinical trials for patients with keratoconus

== Publications ==
=== Books ===
- Ophthalmic Surgical Procedures (1998, 2nd ed 2009). Hersh, P S; Zagelbaum, B; Cremers S L. New York: Thieme Publishing, 2009
- Refractive Surgery. Wu Hu; Steinert, R; Thompson, V; Slade, S; Hersh, P S. New York: Thieme Publishing 1998
- Therapeutic Uses of the Excimer Laser for Corneal Disease. Hersh, P S; Wagoner, M D. New York: Thieme Publishing 1998
- Eye Trauma. Shingleton, B; Hersh, P S; Kenyon, K R. St. Louis: C.V. Mosby, 1991

=== Articles ===
- Hersh PS. Separation and Characterization of the Messenger - RNA's Coding for Alpha-and Beta-Tubulin. Princeton University Thesis (May, 1978).
- Hersh PS & Kenyon KR. Anterior Segment Reconstruction Following Ocular Trauma. Int. Ophth. Clin. 1988;28:57-68.
- Kenyon KR & Hersh PS. Anterior Segment Reconstruction Following Ocular Trauma. An. Inst. Barraquer. 1988–1989;20:257-274.
- Larrison WI, Hersh PS, Kunzweiler T & Shingleton BJ. Sports-Related Ocular Trauma. Ophthal. 1990;97:1265-1269.
- Hersh PS, Kenyon KR. Complications of Radial Keratotomy: Review of the Literature and Implications for a Developing Country. Indian J. Ophthal. 1990;38:132-138.
- Hersh PS & Kenyon KR. Penetrating Keratoplasty for Severe Complications of Radial Keratotomy. Cornea 1991;10:170-174.
- Kenyon KR, Starck T & Hersh PS. Penetrating Keratoplasty and Anterior Segment Reconstruction for Severe Ocular Trauma. Ophthal. 1992;99:396-402.
- Hersh PS, Spinak A, Garrana R & Mayers M. Excimer laser phototherapeutic keratectomy: strategies and results. Refractive and Corneal Surgery 1993;9:S90-S95.
- Hersh PS, Jordan AJ & Mayers M. Corneal graft rejection episode after excimer laser phototherapeutic keratectomy. Arch. Ophthal. 1993;111:735-736.
- Hersh PS, Patel R. Excimer laser correction of myopia and astigmatism using an ablatable mask. Refractive Corneal Surg. 1994;10:250-254.
- Zagelbaum BM, Hersh PS, Donnenfeld ED, Perry HD & Hochman MA. Ocular trauma in major league baseball players. New England Journal of Medicine. 1994;330:1021-1023.
- Hersh PS. Iridoschisis following penetrating keratoplasty for keratoconus. Letter. Cornea. 1994;13:545-546.
- Kenyon KR, Kenyon BM, Starck T & Hersh PS. Penetrating keratoplasty and anterior segment reconstruction for severe ocular trauma. German Journal of Ophthal. 1994;3:90-99.
- Michalos P, Avila EN, FLorakis GJ & Hersh PS. Do human tears absorb ultraviolet light? CLAO Journal. 1994;20:192-193.
- Blaker JW & Hersh PS. Theoretical and clinical effect of corneal curvature on excimer laser photorefractive keratectomy. Refractive Corneal Surg. 1994;10:571-574.
- Hersh PS, Schwartz-Goldstein B. Summit PRK Topography Study Group. Corneal topography of phase III excimer laser photorefractive keratectomy: Characterization and clinical effects. Ophthal. 1995;102:963-978.
- Schwartz-Goldstein B, Hersh PS. Summit PRK Topography Study Group. Corneal topography of phase III excimer laser photorefractive keratectomy: Optical zone centration analysis. Ophthal. 1995;102:951-962.,
- Zagelbaum B, Starkey C, Hersh PS, Donnenfeld ED, Perry HD & Jeffers JB. The National Basketball Association (NBA) eye injury study. Arch. Ophthal.. 1995;113:749-752.,
- Carr J, Patel R, Hersh PS. Management of late corneal haze following photorefractive keratectomy. J. Refractive Surg. 1995;11:309-313.
- Burnstein Y, Klapper D, Hersh PS. Experimental wound rupture following excimer laser photorefractive keratectomy. Arch. Ophthal. 1995;113:1056-1059.
- Maloney RK, Chan WK, Steinert R, Hersh P & O'Connell M. A multicenter trial of photorefractive keratectomy for residual myopia following previous ocular surgery. Ophthal. 1995;102:1042-1053.
- Hersh PS, Carr JD. Excimer laser photorefractive keratectomy. Ophthalmic Practice 1995; 13:126-133.
- Burnstein Y, Hersh PS. Photorefractive keratectomy following radial keratotomy. J Refract Surg. 1996;12:163-170.,
- Hersh PS, Shah S, Geiger D, Holladay J. Corneal topography irregularities after excimer laser photorefractive keratectomy. Best Paper of Session Supplement. J Cat Refractive Surg 1995;21:9-13.
- Shah, SI, Hersh PS. Photorefractive keratectomy for myopia using a 6-mm optical zone. J Refract Surg. 1996;12:341-351.,
- Hersh PS, Shah SI, Durrie D. Monocular diplopia following excimer laser photorefractive keratectomy after radial keratotomy. Ophth Surg Lasers. 1996;27:315-317.
- Hersh PS, Shah S, Holladay JT. Corneal asphericity following excimer laser photorefractive keratectomy. Ophth Surg Lasers. 1996;27S:421-428.
- Hersh PS, Shah S, Geiger D, Holladay J, Summit Photorefractive Keratectomy Topography Study Group. Corneal optical irregularity after excimer laser photorefractive keratectomy. J. Cat. Refract. Surg. 1996:22:197-204.
- Hersh PS, Burnstein Y, Carr J, Etwaru G, Mayers M. Phototherapeutic keratectomy: surgical strategies and clinical outcomes. Ophthal. 1996;103:1210-1222.,
- Hersh PS, Schein OD, Steinert RF. Characteristics influencing outcomes of photorefractive keratectomy. Ophthal. 1996;103:1964-1969 .
- Carr JD, Hersh PS. Excimer laser technology: key concepts for the ophthalmologist. Seminars in Ophthal. 1996;11:212-223.
- Shah S, Hersh PS. Evolving bias in reporting refractive surgery in the popular press. J. Refract. Surg. 1996;12:638-641.
- Zagelbaum B, Starkey C, Hersh PS, Donnenfeld ED, Perry HD & Jeffers JB. The National Basketball Association eye injury study. Sports Vision 1996;12:7-11.,
- Hersh PS, Shah S, Summit PRK Topography Study Group. Corneal topography of 6.0 mm excimer laser photorefractive keratectomy: Characterization and clinical effects. Ophthal. 1997;104:1333-1342.
- Hersh PS, Stulting D, Steinert RF, Waring GO, Thompson K, Doney K, O'Connell M. Results of phase III excimer laser photorefractive keratectomy for myopia. Ophthal. 1997;104:1535-1553.
- Scher KS, Hersh PS. Disparity between refractive error and visual acuity after photorefractive keratectomy: Multifocal corneal effects. J Cat Ref Surg. 1997;23:1029-1033.
- Hersh P. A standardized classification system for corneal topography patterns after laser refractive surgery. J Refract Surg. 1997;13:571-578.
- Hersh PS, Scher KS, Irani R. Corneal topography of PRK and LASIK. Ophthal. 1998;105:612-619.
- Hersh PS, Brint SF, Berkeley RB, Durrie DS, Gordon M, Maloney RK, Michelson MA, Thompson VM. PRK versus LASIK for moderate to high myopia: A prospective randomized study. Ophthalmology 1998;15:1512-1522.
- Steinert RF, Hersh PS. Spherical and aspherical photorefractive keratectomy and laser in situ keratomileusis for moderate to high myopia: Two prospective, randomized clinical trials. Tr Am Ophth Soc 1998;96:197-227.
- Abbas U, Hersh PS Natural history of corneal topography after excimer laser photorefractive keratectomy. Ophthalmology, 1998;15:2212-2224.
- Manche EE, Carr JD, Haw WW, Hersh PS. Excimer laser refractive surgery. West J Med. 1998;169:30-38
- Abbas U, Hersh PS. Copy of Early Corneal topography patterns after excimer laser photorefractive keratectomy. Ophthalmology, 1999; 115:22-26.
- Chiang PK, Hersh PS. Comparing predictability between eyes after bilateral laser in situ keratomileusis. Ophthalmology, 1999:106;1684-1691.
- Hersh PS, Abbassi R. Surgically induced astigmatism after photorefractive keratectomy and laser in situ keratomileusis. J Cataract Refract Surg, 1999:25:389-398.
- Fisher EM, Ginsberg NE, Scher KS, Hersh PS. Photorefractive Keratectomy for myopia with a 15 Hz repetition rate.1999;26:363-368.
- Hersh PS, Steinert RF, Brint SF Phototherapeutic Keratectomy.versus laser in situ keratomileusis. Comparison of optical side effects. Ophthalmology 2000:107:925-933.
- Ginsberg NE, Hersh PS. Effect of lamellar flap location on corneal topography after laser in situ keratomileusis. J Cataract Refract Surg. 2000;26;992-1000.
- Dastgheib KA, Clinch TE, Manche EE, Hersh P, Ramsey J. Sloughing of corneal epithelium and wound healing complications associated with laser in situ keratomileusis in patients with epithelial basement membrane dystrophy. Am J Ophthalmol 2000;130:297-303.
- Lumba J, Hersh PS. Topography changes associated with sublamellar epithelial ingrowth after laser in situ keratomileusis. J Cataract Refract Surg 26;2000:1413-1416.
- Karp KO, Hersh PS, Epstein RJ. Delayed keratitis after laser in situ keratomileusis. J. Cat Refract Surg 2000;26:925-928.
- Abbas UL, Hersh PS. of Late natural history of Corneal Topography after excimer laser photorefractive keratectomy.PRK Ophthalmology 2001;108:953-959.
- Asbell PA, Maloney RK, Davidorf J, Hersh P, McDonald M, Manche E. Conductive keratoplasty for the Correction of Hyperopia Trans Am Ophthalmological Society 2001; 99:79-97.
- McDonald MB, Davidorf J, Maloney RK, Manche EE, Hersh P. Conductive Keratoplasty for Correction of low to moderate Hyperopia Ophthalmology 2002; 109:637-649
- Leu G, Hersh PS. Phototherapeutic Keratectomy for the treatment of diffuse lamellar keratitis. J Cat Refract 2002;28: 1471.1474.
- Hersh PS, Ratkaran R, Hersh D. Contact Lens evaluation of corneal Keratoplasty for the correction of corbeal topography irregularities after laser refractive surgery. J Cat Refract Surg 2002;28:2054-2057.
- McDonald MB, Hersh P, Manche EE, Maloney RK, Davidorf J, Sabry M. Conductive Keratoplasty for the correction of low to moderate hyperopia US clinical trial 1 year results 355 eyes Ophthalmology 2002; 109: 1978-1990 .
- Hersh PS; Fry KL, Bishop DS.Incidence and Association of Retreatment after LASIK Ophthalmology 2003; 110:748-754.Vol 110 No 4 April 2003.pdf
- Hersh PS, Fry KL, Blaker, JW. Spherical aberration after LASIK and PRK. J Cat Refract Surg 2003;11:2096-2104.
- Klein S, Fry KL, Hersh PS. LASIK after conductive keratoplasty. J Cat Refract Surg 2004;30:702-705.
- Steinert RF, Ashrafzadeh A, Hersh PS. Results of phototherapeutic keratectomy in the management of flap striae after LASIK. Ophthalmology 2004;111:740-746.
- Hersh PS, Fry K, Chandrashekhar R, Fikaris DS. Conductive keratoplasty to complications of LASIK and photorefractive keratectomy. Ophthalmology 2005;112:1941-1947.
- Hersh PS. Optics of conductive keratoplasty. Implications for presbyopia management. Trans Am Ophthalmol Soc 2005;103:412-456.
- Patel SR, Chu DS, Ayres B, Hersh PS. Corneal edema and penetrating keratoplasty after anterior chamber phakic intraocular lens implantation. J Cat Refract Surg 2005;31:2212-2215.
- Xu Y, Hersh PS, Chu DS. Wavefront analysis and Scheimpflug imagery in diagnosis of anterior lenticonus. J Cat Refract Surg 2010;36:850-853.
- Van De Sompel D, Kunkel G, Hersh PS, Smiths AJ. Model of accommodation: Contributions of lens geometry and mechanical properties to the development of presbyopia. J Cat Refract Surg 2010;36:1960-1971.
- Greenstein SA, Fry KL, Bhatt J, Hersh PS. Natural history of corneal haze after collagen crosslinking for keratoconus and corneal ectasia: A Scheimpflug and biomicroscopic analysis. J Cat Refract Surg 2010;36:2105-2114.
- Hersh PS, Greenstein SA, Fry KL. Corneal collagen crosslinking for keratoconus and corneal ectasia: One year results. J Cat Refract Surg 2011;37:149-160.
- Greenstein SA, Shah VP, Fry KL, Hersh PS. Corneal thickness changes after corneal collagen crosslinking for keratoconus and corneal ectasia: One-year results. J Cat Refract Surg 2011; 37:691-700.
- Archna P, Fry KL, Hersh PS. Relationship of Age and Refraction to Central Corneal Thickness. Cornea 2011; 30: 553–555.
- Greenstein SA, Fry KL, Hersh PS. Corneal topography indices after corneal collagen crosslinking for keratoconus and corneal ectasia One-year results. J Cat Refract Surg 2011; 37: 1282–1290.
- Greenstein SA, Fry KL, Hersh PS. In Vivo Biomechanical Changes After Corneal Collagen Cross-linking for Keratoconus and Corneal Ectasia: 1-Year Analysis of a Randomized, Controlled, Clinical Trial. Cornea 202; 31: 21–25.
- Greenstein SA, Fry KL, Hersh, MJ, Hersh PS. Higher-order aberrations after corneal collagen crosslinking for keratoconus and corneal ectasia. J Cat Refract Surg 2012; 38: 292–302.
- Brooks NO, Greenstein SA, Fry KL, Hersh PS. Patient subjective visual function after corneal collagen crosslinking for keratoconus and corneal ectasia. J Cat Refract Surg 2012; 38:615-619.
- Hersh PS, Lai MJ, Gelles JD, Lesniak SP. Transepithelial corneal crosslinking for keratoconus. J Cat Refract Surg 2018; 44:313-322.
- Lai MJ, Greenstein SA, Gelles JD, Hersh PS. Corneal Haze after Transepithelial Collagen Crosslinking for Keratoconus: A Scheimpflug Densitometry Analysis. Cornea. 2020;39(9):1117-1121.
