= Post-LASIK ectasia =

Eye condition

Post-LASIK ectasia is a condition similar to keratoconus where the cornea starts to bulge forwards at a variable time after LASIK, PRK, or SMILE corneal laser eye surgery. However, the physiological processes of post-LASIK ectasia seem to be different from keratoconus. The visible changes in the basal epithelial cell and anterior and posterior keratocytes linked with keratoconus were not observed in post-LASIK ectasia.

== Risk factors ==
Before corneal refractive surgery such as LASIK, SMILE, and PRK, people must be examined for possible risk factors such as keratoconus.

Abnormal corneal topography compromises of keratoconus, pellucid marginal degeneration, or forme fruste keratoconus with an I-S value of 1.4 or more is the most significant risk factor. Low age, low residual stromal bed (RSB) thickness, low preoperative corneal thickness, and high myopia are other important risk factors.

== Treatments ==
Treatment options include contact lenses, intrastromal corneal ring segments, custom topography-guided transepithelial PRK combined with corneal collagen cross-linking, or corneal transplant.

When cross-linking is performed only after the cornea becomes distorted, vision remains blurry even though the disease is stabilised. As a result, combining corneal collagen cross-linking with LASIK ('LASIK Xtra') aims to strengthen the cornea at the point of surgery and may be useful in cases where a very thin cornea is expected after the LASIK procedure. This would include cases of high spectacle power and people with thin corneas before surgery. Definitive evidence that the procedure can reduce the risk of corneal ectasia will only become available a number of years later as corneal ectasia, if it happens, usually occurs in the late post-operative period. Some study show that combining LASIK with cross-linking adds refractive stability to hyperopic treatments and may also do the same for very high myopic treatments.

In 2016, the FDA approved the KXL system and two photoenhancers for the treatment of corneal ectasia following refractive surgery.
