= Corneal ectatic disorders =

Group of eye disorders

Corneal ectatic disorders or corneal ectasia are a group of uncommon, noninflammatory, eye disorders characterised by bilateral thinning of the central, paracentral, or peripheral cornea.

== Types ==
- Keratoconus, a progressive, noninflammatory, bilateral, asymmetric disease, characterized by paraxial stromal thinning and weakening that leads to corneal surface distortion.
- Keratoglobus, a rare noninflammatory corneal thinning disorder, characterised by generalised thinning and globular protrusion of the cornea.
- Pellucid marginal degeneration, a bilateral, noninflammatory disorder, characterized by a peripheral band of thinning of the inferior cornea.
- Posterior keratoconus, a rare condition, usually congenital, which causes a nonprogressive thinning of the inner surface of the cornea, while the curvature of the anterior surface remains normal. Usually only a single eye is affected.
- Post-LASIK ectasia, a complication of LASIK eye surgery.
- Terrien's marginal degeneration, a painless, noninflammatory, unilateral or asymmetrically bilateral, slowly progressive thinning of the peripheral corneal stroma.

== Diagnosis ==
Usually diagnosed clinically by several clinical tests. Although some investigations might needed for confirming the diagnosis and to differentiate different types of corneal ectatic diseases.

- Corneal topography
- Corneal tomography

== Treatment ==
Treatment options include contact lenses and intrastromal corneal ring segments for correcting refractive errors caused by irregular corneal surface, corneal collagen cross-linking to strengthen a weak and ectatic cornea, or corneal transplant for advanced cases.
