= Scleral lens =

Large contact lens resting on the sclera, creating a tear-filled vault over the cornea

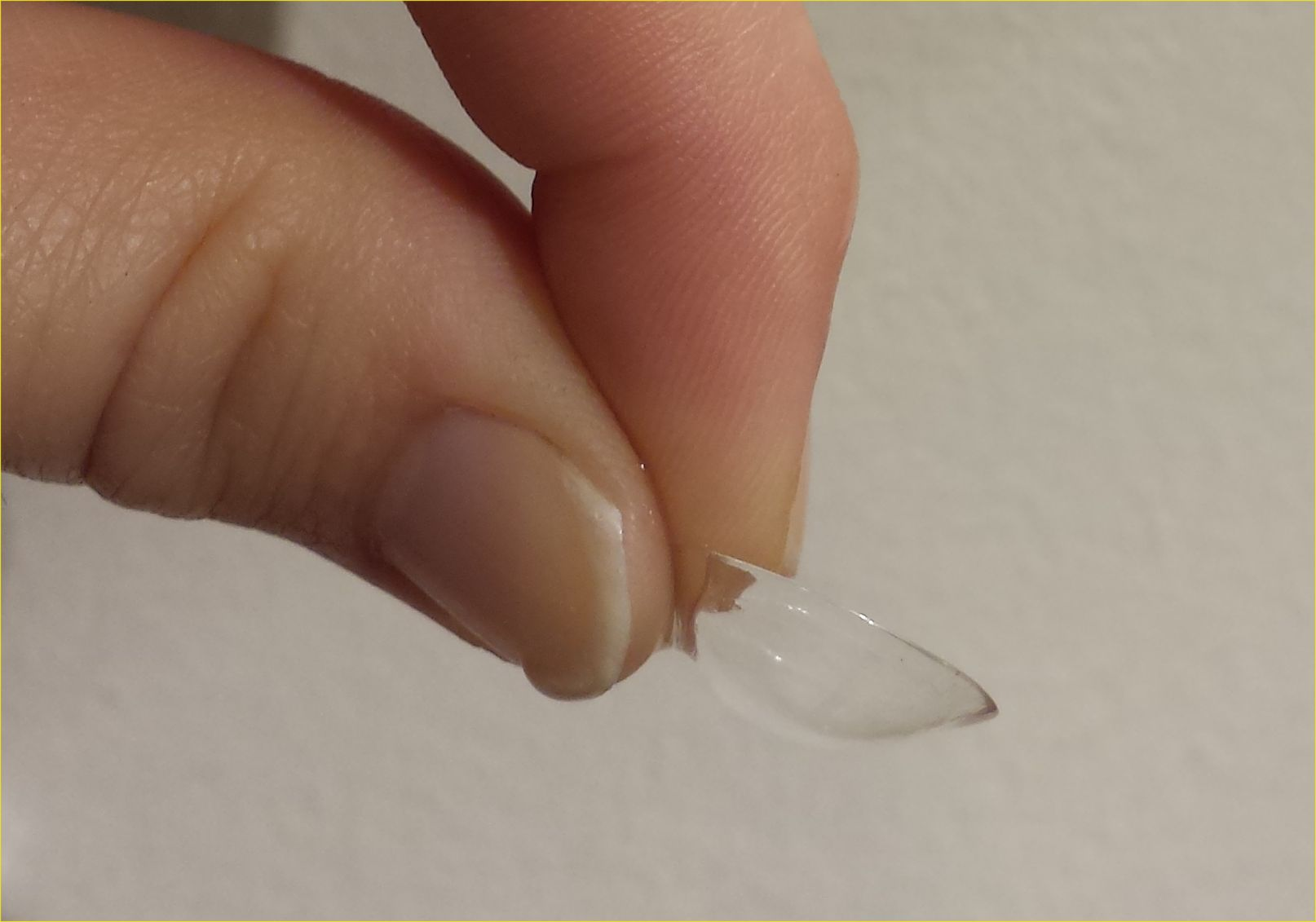
- Side view displaying vaulted area of a scleral lens
- Other names: Scleral contact lens, ocular surface prostheses

A scleral lens, also known as a scleral contact lens, is a large contact lens that rests on the sclera and creates a tear-filled vault over the cornea. Scleral lenses are designed to treat a variety of eye conditions, many of which do not respond to other forms of treatment.

== Uses ==
=== Medical uses ===
Scleral lenses may be used to improve vision and reduce pain and light sensitivity for people with a growing number of disorders or injuries to the eye, such as severe dry eye syndrome, microphthalmia, keratoconus, corneal ectasia, Stevens–Johnson syndrome, Sjögren's disease, aniridia, neurotrophic keratitis (anesthetic corneas), complications post-LASIK, higher-order aberrations of the eye, complications post-corneal transplant and pellucid degeneration. Injuries to the eye such as surgical complications, distorted corneal implants, as well as chemical and burn injuries also may be treated by the use of scleral lenses.

Sclerals may also be used in people with eyes that are too sensitive for other smaller corneal-type lenses, but require a more rigid lens for vision correction conditions such as astigmatism.

=== Special effects ===
A variant of scleral lenses that do not use reservoirs are commonplace as practical effects in films and television shows, and are used as part of costume design to represent characters with unusually-coloured eyes.

=== Eye movement measurement ===
In experiments in ophthalmology or cognitive science, scleral lenses with embedded mirrors or with embedded magnetic field sensors in form of wire coils (called scleral coils) are commonly used for measuring eye movements.

== Design ==
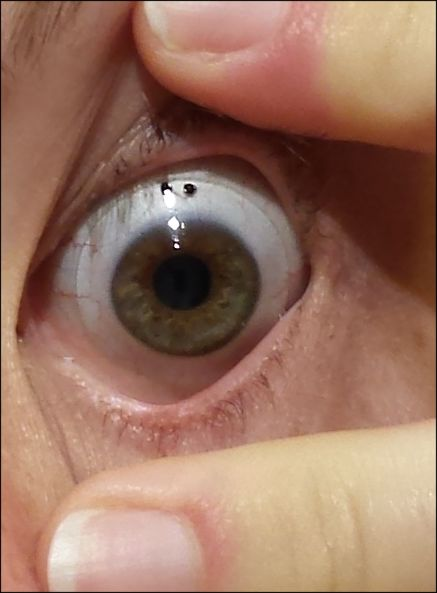
Scleral lens, with visible outer edge resting on the sclera of a patient with chronic severe dry eye syndrome.

Modern scleral lenses are made of a highly oxygen permeable polymer. They are unique in their design in that they fit onto and are supported by the sclera, the white portion of the eye. The cause of this unique positioning is usually relevant to a specific patient, whose cornea may be too sensitive to support the lens directly. In comparison to corneal contact lenses, scleral lenses bulge outward considerably more. The space between the cornea and the lens is filled with artificial tears. The liquid, which is contained in a thin elastic reservoir, conforms to the irregularities of the deformed cornea, allowing vision to be restored comfortably. This helps to give the patient BCVA, or Best Corrected Visual Acuity.

Scleral lenses differ from corneal contact lenses in that they create a space between the cornea and the lens, which is filled with fluid. The prosthetic application of the lenses is to cover or "bandage" the ocular surface, providing a therapeutic environment for managing severe ocular surface disease. The outward bulge of scleral lenses and the liquid-filled space between the cornea and the lens also conforms to irregular corneas and may neutralize corneal surface irregularities.

== Usage ==
=== Insertion ===
Scleral lenses may be inserted into the eye directly from the fingers, from a hand held plunger, or from a stationary lighted plunger on a stand. Prior to inserting the scleral, the lens is over-filled with a sterile saline or other prescribed solution mixture. Some fluid is allowed to drip from the lens as it is inserted in order to ensure no bubbles become trapped under the lens after it is seated on the eye. If there is a bubble trapped, it is usually recommended to remove the lens and reinsert it. The lens can then be rotated to the correct orientation, often denoted by a mark at either the "top" or the "bottom" of the lens. A "left" scleral lens is often marked with two dots, and a "right" is marked with one dot. Less commonly, the "right lens" may instead be tinted blue.

=== Removal and storage ===
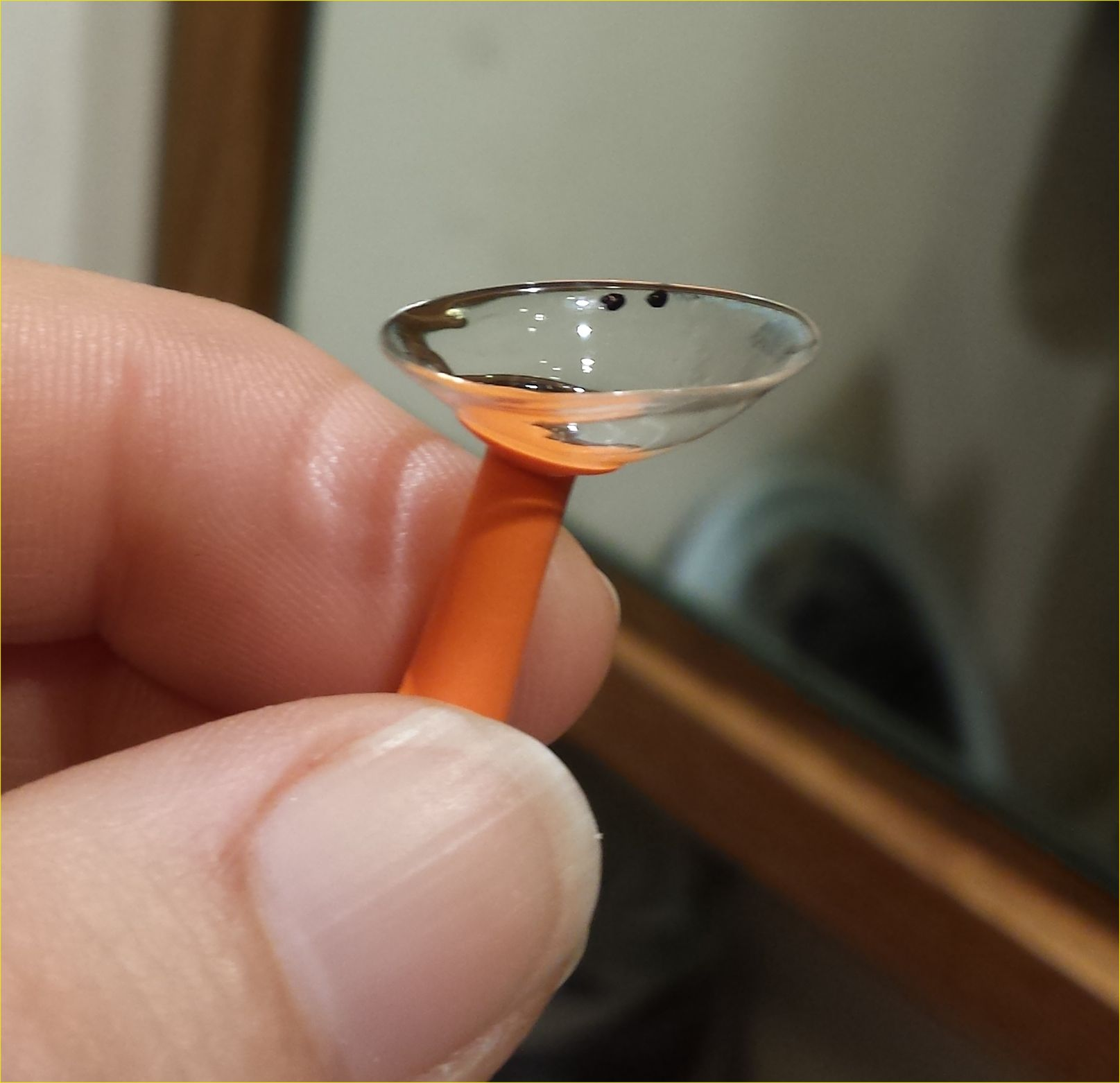
Scleral lens prescribed for dry eye, on a removal plunger

Scleral lenses are removed using the fingers, or a small lens removal plunger. Lenses are then cleaned and sanitized before reinsertion. Scleral lenses cannot be worn while sleeping and many wearers sanitize their lenses overnight. Unlike regular contact lenses, many sclerals can be stored dry when unused for longer periods of time.

== History ==
A scleral lens is a prototypical lens dating back to the early 1880s. Originally these lenses were designed by using a substance to take a mold of the eye. Lenses were then shaped to conform to the mould, initially using blown glass and then ground glass in the 1920s, and polymethyl methacrylate in the 1940s. Early sclerals were not oxygen permeable, which severely restricted the amount of oxygen provided to the cornea of the wearer. As such, early lenses fell into disuse until the 1970s.
