= Pellucid marginal degeneration =

Degenerative corneal condition

- Other names: PMD
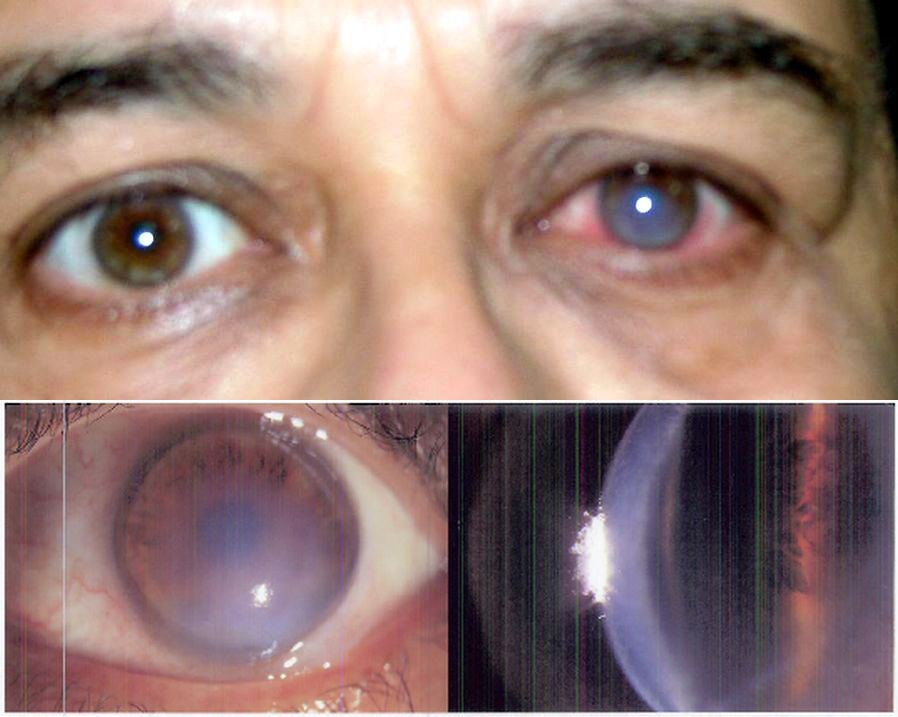
- Pellucid corneal degeneration with hydrops and detachment of Descemet's membrane
- Specialty: Ophthalmology
- Symptoms: Vision loss
- Complications: Corneal perforation
- Diagnostic method: Corneal topography
- Differential diagnosis: Keratoconus
- Treatment: Vision correction (eyeglasses or contact lenses)
- Frequency: Very rare

Pellucid marginal degeneration (PMD) is a degenerative corneal condition, often confused with keratoconus. It typically presents with painless vision loss affecting both eyes. Rarely, it may cause acute vision loss with severe pain due to perforation of the cornea. It is typically characterized by a clear, bilateral thinning (ectasia) in the inferior and peripheral region of the cornea, although some cases affect only one eye. The cause of the disease remains unclear.

Pellucid marginal degeneration is diagnosed by corneal topography. Corneal pachymetry may be useful in confirming the diagnosis. Treatment usually consists of vision correction with eyeglasses or contact lenses. Intacs implants, corneal collagen cross-linking, and corneal transplant surgery are additional options. Surgery is reserved for individuals who do not tolerate contact lenses.

The term pellucid marginal degeneration was coined in 1957 by the ophthalmologist Schalaeppi. The word "pellucid" means clear, indicating that the corneas retain clarity in pellucid marginal degeneration. The condition is rare, though the exact prevalence and incidence are unknown.

== Signs and symptoms ==
Pain is not typically present in pellucid marginal degeneration, and aside from vision loss, no symptoms accompany the condition. However, in rare cases, PMD may present with sudden onset vision loss and excruciating eye pain, which occurs if the thinning of the cornea leads to perforation. While PMD usually affects both eyes, some unilateral cases have been reported.

PMD is characterized by bilateral thinning (ectasia) in the inferior and peripheral region of the cornea. The distribution of the degeneration is crescent or arcuate shaped. The cornea just above the region of thinning is of normal thickness, and may protrude anteriorly, which creates an irregular astigmatism. This is described as a "beer belly" appearance since the greatest protrusion occurs below the horizontal midline (unlike keratoconus). Normally, PMD does not present with vascularization of the cornea, scarring, or any deposits of lipid.

== Pathophysiology ==
PMD is an idiopathic, non-inflammatory condition. The thinning of the cornea may approach 20% of normal thickness. There may be an increase in the number of mucopolysaccharides in the corneal stroma. The Bowman's layer of the cornea may be absent, irregular, or have ruptured areas.

== Diagnosis ==
The center of the cornea shows normal thickness, with an intact central epithelium, but the inferior cornea exhibits a peripheral band of thinning, to about 1–2 mm. The portion of the cornea that is immediately adjacent to the limbus is spared, usually a strip of about 1–2 mm. In PMD we can see high against the rule astigmatism along with horizontal bow ties. The inferior peripheral thinning is seen between the 4 o'clock and 8 o'clock positions.

PMD lacks apical corneal scarring, Rizutti's phenomenon, Munson's sign, and the central corneal thickness is usually normal.

The gold standard diagnostic test for PMD is corneal topography. However, it may not be as specific as corneal pachymetry, because corneal topography only evaluates the degree and distribution of surface irregularities on the cornea, not the thickness of the cornea. Corneal topography may show a "crab claw-like" appearance, a finding that is seen in both keratoconus and in pellucid marginal degeneration. Thus, if corneal topography is used for diagnosis, it should be in conjunction with clinical findings of peripheral, inferior corneal thinning.

== Treatment ==
=== Eye glasses ===
Most people can be treated non-surgically with eyeglasses, or contact lenses.

=== Contact lenses ===
The early stages of pellucid marginal degeneration may also be managed with soft contact lenses. Success has been shown with the use of rigid gas permeable contact lenses combined with over-refraction. People wearing contacts don't report increased problems with glare and contrast sensitivity, but it is not clear if this is due to the corneal disease, or the contact lenses themselves.

New studies found that the use of scleral contact lens, a type of rigid gas permeable (RGP) lens, may be a good option for most people with PMD. Most of these lenses are in the range of 15.5mm to 18.0mm in diameter. Regardless of the lens size, it is thought that the larger the RGP lens will in most cases be more comfortable than standard rigid corneal lenses, and at times more comfortable than soft lenses, regardless of the fact that it is a rigid lens. The highlight to the scleral design and the correction of eye disorders such as pellucid marginal degeneration is that vision with these types of lenses is exceptional when fit correctly.

=== Intacs ===
The use of intacs implants has been tested as a treatment for PMD, with slight improvement in visual acuity noted after eleven months, and intacs have been used with keratoconus with success.

=== Corneal collagen cross-linking ===
There is evidence suggesting corneal collagen cross-linking may be beneficial for patients with pellucid marginal degeneration. Research shows some promising results by combining collagen cross linking with photorefractive keratectomy, or with topography-guided transepithelial surface ablation.

=== Surgery ===
Corneal transplant surgery may be difficult due to the peripheral thinning of the cornea, even with large and off-center grafts. Therefore, surgery is usually reserved for people that do not tolerate contact lenses. Several different surgical approaches may be taken, and no one approach is currently established as the standard. Examples of surgical procedures used for PMD include: wedge resection, lamellar crescentic resection, penetrating keratoplasty, lamellar keratoplasty, epikeratoplasty and intracorneal segments. Transplantation of the entire thickness of the cornea (penetrating keratoplasty) may be performed if there is enough normal tissue present. However, if there is not enough normal tissue present, then attaching the graft is difficult. New surgical techniques are in evaluation such as Intrastromal lamellar Keratoplasties and Sclerocorneal Intrastromal Lamellar Keratoplasty (SILK), these techniques allow thickening of the inferior peripheral cornea and steepening of the vertical meridien.

Due to the thinning of the cornea, people with PMD are poor candidates for procedures such as LASIK and photorefractive keratectomy.

== Prognosis ==
Visual function declines as a result of the irregular corneal shape, resulting in astigmatism, and causing a distortion in vision. Deterioration can become severe over time.

== Epidemiology ==
The incidence and prevalence of PMD are unknown, and no studies have yet investigated its prevalence or incidence. However, it is generally agreed that PMD is a very rare condition. Some uncertainty regarding the incidence of PMD may be attributed to its confusion with keratoconus. PMD is not linked to race or age, although most cases present early in life, between 20 and 40 years of age. While PMD is usually considered to affect men and women equally, some studies suggest that it may affect men more frequently.

Several diseases have been observed in people with PMD. However, no causal relationships have been established between any of the associated diseases and the pathogenesis of PMD. Such diseases include: chronic open angle glaucoma, retinitis pigmentosa, retinal lattice degeneration, scleroderma, kerato-conjunctivitis, eczema, and hyperthyroidism.

== See also ==
- Corneal ectatic disorders
