= Cross-linking =

Cross-linking may refer to

- Cross-link, a chemical bond of one polymer chain to another
- Crosslink, a common name for a type of viscous, gel-like fracking fluid used to inject proppant more easily and deeply to maintain open fractures after pressure release in hydraulic fracturing (fracking)
- Corneal collagen cross-linking, a parasurgical treatment for corneal ectasia and keratoconus
