= Corneal topography =

Medical imaging technique for the surface of the eye's cornea

Corneal
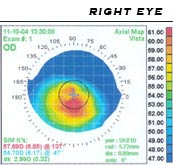
- A corneal topogram of an eye affected by keratoconus. Blue shows the flattest areas, and red the steepest.
- MeSH: D019781

Corneal topography, also known as photokeratoscopy or videokeratography, is a non-invasive medical imaging technique for mapping the anterior curvature of the cornea, the outer structure of the eye. Since the cornea is normally responsible for some 70% of the eye's refractive power, its topography is of critical importance in determining the quality of vision and corneal health.

The three-dimensional map is therefore a valuable aid to the examining ophthalmologist or optometrist and can assist in the diagnosis and treatment of a number of conditions; in planning cataract surgery and intraocular lens implantation; in planning refractive surgery such as LASIK, and evaluating its results; or in assessing the fit of contact lenses. A development of keratoscopy, corneal topography extends the measurement range from the four points a few millimeters apart that is offered by keratometry to a grid of thousands of points covering the entire cornea. The procedure is carried out in seconds and is painless.

== Operation ==
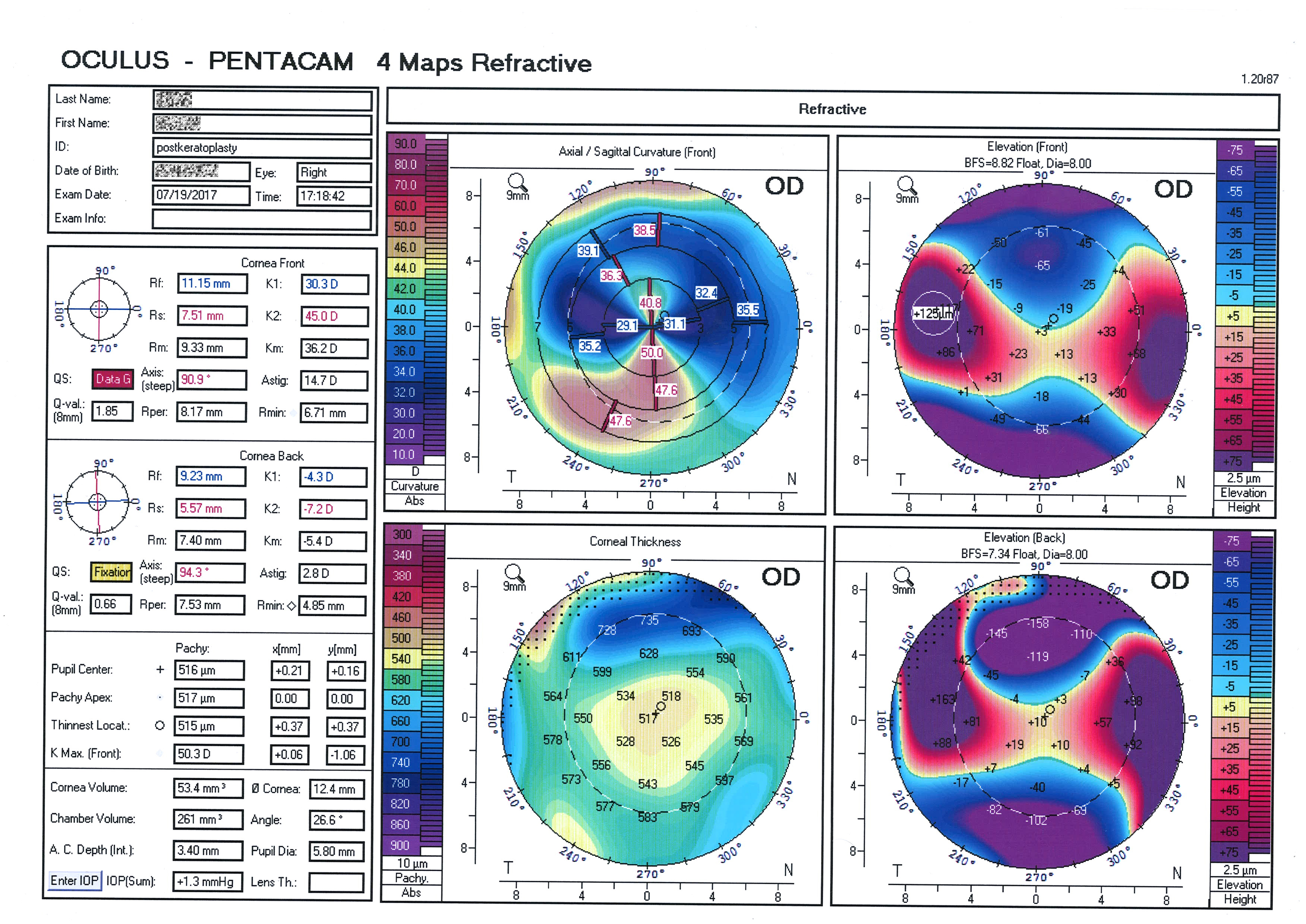
Oculus Pentacam™ Corneal Eye Scan

The patient is seated facing the device, which is raised to eye level. One design consists of a bowl containing an illuminated pattern, such as a series of concentric rings. Another type uses a mechanically rotated arm bearing a light source. In either type, light is focused on the anterior surface of the patient's cornea and reflected back to a digital camera at the device. The topology of the cornea is revealed by the shape taken by the reflected pattern. A computer provides the necessary analysis, typically determining the position and height of several thousand points across the cornea. The topographical map can be represented in a number of graphical formats, such as a sagittal map, which color-codes the steepness of curvature according to its dioptric value.

== Development ==
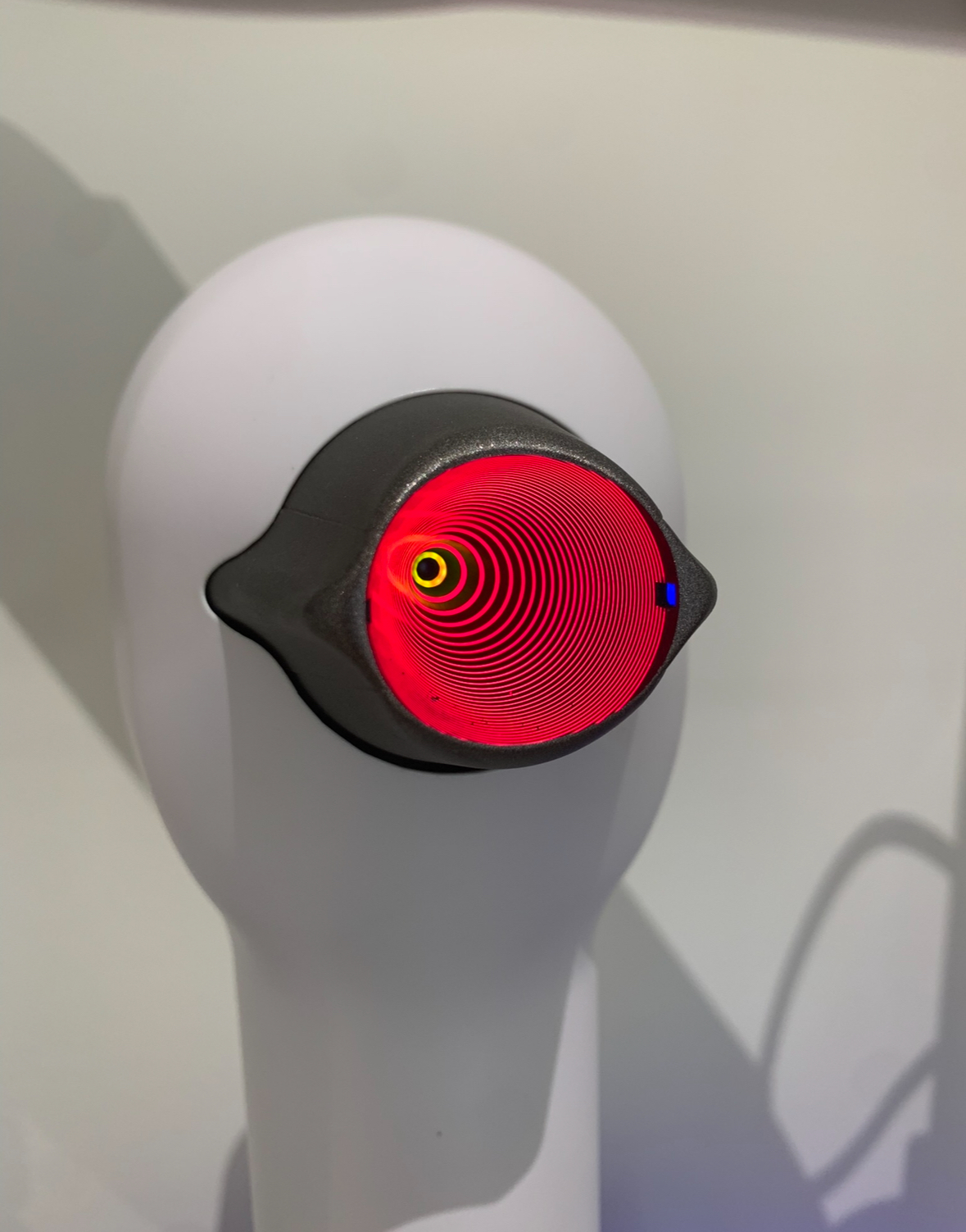
A Medmont E300 topographer, using a bowl of illuminated rings

The corneal topograph owes its heritage to the Portuguese ophthalmologist Antonio Placido, who, in 1880, viewed a painted disk (Placido's disk) of alternating black and white rings reflected in the cornea. The rings showed as contour lines projected on the corneal tear film. The French ophthalmologist Louis Émile Javal incorporated the rings in his ophthalmometer and mounted an eyepiece which magnified the image of the eye. He proposed that the image should be photographed or diagrammatically represented to allow analysis of the image.

In 1896, Allvar Gullstrand incorporated the disk in his ophthalmoscope, examining photographs of the cornea via a microscope and was able to manually calculate the curvature by means of a numerical algorithm. Gullstrand recognized the potential of the technique and commented that despite its laboriousness it could "give a resultant accuracy that previously could not be obtained in any other way". The flat field of Placido's disk reduced the accuracy close to the corneal periphery and in the 1950s the Wesley-Jessen company made use of a curved bowl to reduce the field defects. The curvature of the cornea could be determined from comparison of photographs of the rings against standardized images.

In the 1980s, photographs of the projected images became hand-digitized and then analysed by computer. Automation of the process soon followed with the image captured by a digital camera and passed directly to a computer. In the 1990s, systems became commercially available from a number of suppliers. The first completely automatic system was the Corneal Modeling System (CMS-1) developed by Computed Anatomy, Inc. in New York City, under the direction of Martin Gersten and a group of surgeons at the New York Eye and Ear Infirmary. The price of the early instruments was initially very high ($75,000), largely confining their use to research establishments. However, prices have fallen substantially over time, bringing corneal topographs into the budget of smaller clinics and increasing the number of patients that can be examined.

== Use ==
Corneal topography showing stage II keratoconus.

Computerized corneal topography can be employed for diagnostics. It is, in fact, one of the exams the patients have to undergo prior to the Cross-linking and the Mini Asymmetric Radial Keratotomy (M.A.R.K.). For example, the KISA% index (keratometry, I-S, skew percentage, astigmatism) is used to arrive at a diagnosis of keratoconus, to screen the suspect keratoconic patients and analyse the degree of corneal steepness changes in healthy relatives.

Nevertheless, topography in itself is a measurement of the first reflective surface of the eye (tear film) and is not giving any additional information beside the shape of this layer expressed in curvature. Keratoconus in itself is a pattern of the entire cornea, therefore every measurement just focusing on one layer, might not be enough for a state of the art diagnosis. Especially early cases of keratoconus might be missed by a plain topographic measurement, which is critical if refractive surgery is being considered. The measurement is also sensitive to unstable tear films. Also, the alignment of the measurement can be difficult, especially with eyes that have keratoconus, a significant astigmatism, or sometimes after refractive surgery.

Corneal topography instruments generate a measurement called simulated keratometry (SimK), which approximates the classic measurement of the widely used keratometer. Another novel use of corneal topographic data is called CorT, which has been shown to quantify refractive astigmatism more accurately than SimK and other approaches. CorT utilizes data from all Placido rings across the cornea compared with SimK, which is based on only one ring.

While corneal topography relies on reflected light from the front (anterior) of the cornea, a technique called corneal tomography also provides a measure of the back (posterior) shape of the cornea. A measure called CorT total includes this posterior corneal data and more accurately reflects refraction compared with regular CorT, SimK, and other techniques.
