= Keratoscope =

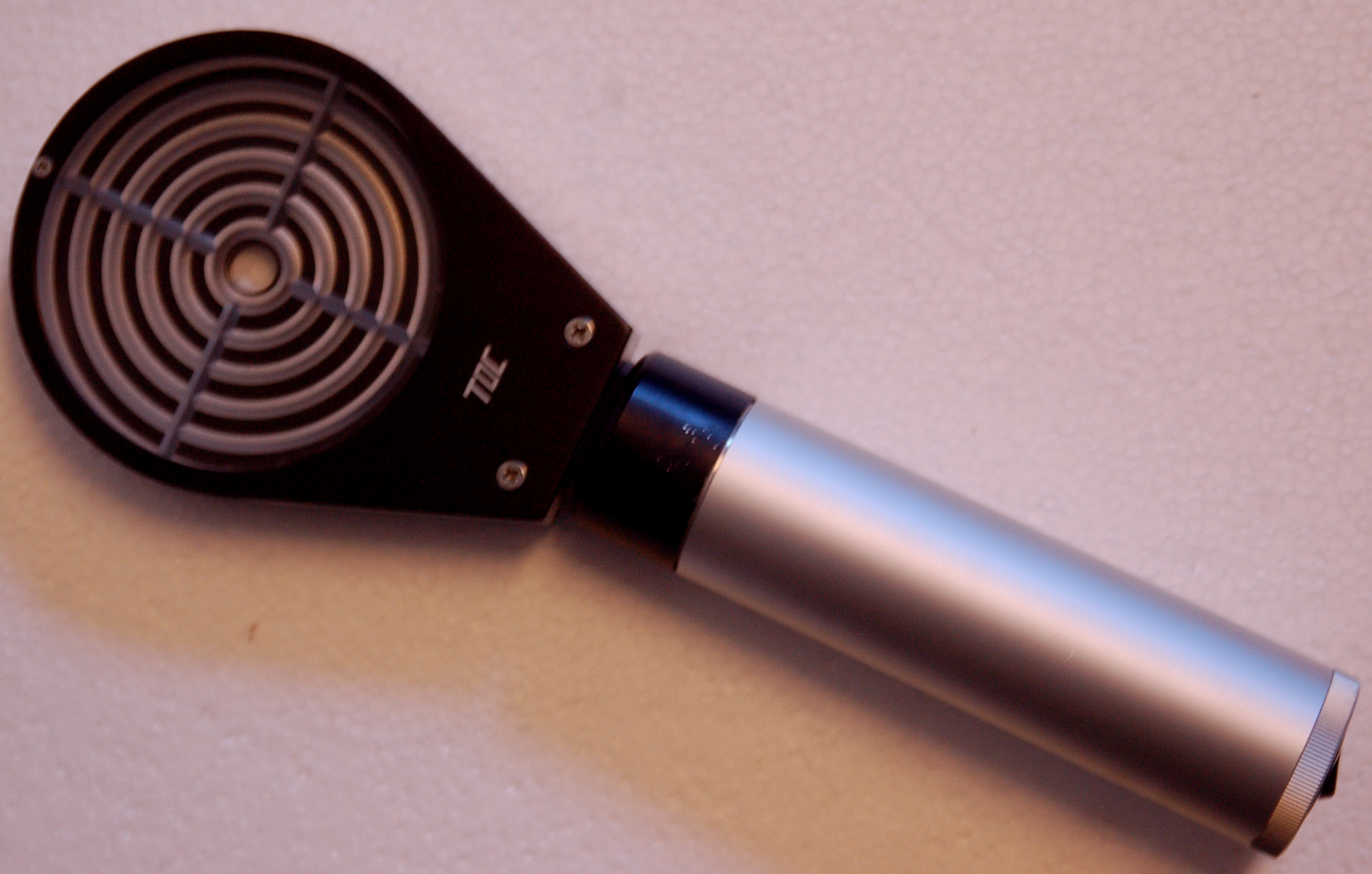
- A keratoscope
- Purpose: assess shape of cornea

A keratoscope, sometimes known as Placido's disk, is an ophthalmic instrument used to assess the shape of the anterior surface of the cornea. A series of concentric rings is projected onto the cornea and their reflection viewed by the examiner through a small hole in the centre of the disk. A regular-shaped cornea should show equally spaced symmetric reflections. If the patient has astigmatism or corneal dystrophy, the rings will be distorted.

A modern development of the concept is found in corneal topography, in which analysis of the reflected image is passed to a computer. The automated instrument can produce colour-coded contour maps of the eye's topography or even three-dimensional visualisations of its surface.
