= Keratoglobus =

- Specialty: Ophthalmology

Keratoglobus (from Greek: kerato- horn, cornea; and Latin: globus round) is a degenerative non-inflammatory disorder of the eye in which structural changes within the cornea cause it to become extremely thin and change to a more globular shape than its normal gradual curve. It causes corneal thinning, primarily at the margins, resulting in a spherical, slightly enlarged eye.

It is sometimes equated with "megalocornea".

== Pathophysiology ==
Keratoglobus is a little-understood disease with an uncertain cause, and its progression following diagnosis is unpredictable. If afflicting both eyes, the deterioration in vision can affect the patient's ability to drive a car or read normal print. It does not however lead to blindness.

== Treatment ==
Treatment includes the use of protective eye glasses. A number of surgical options are also available.

Further progression of the disease usually leads to a need for corneal transplantation because of extreme thinning of the cornea. Primarily, large size penetrating keratoplasty has been advocated. Recent additions of techniques specifically for keratoglobus include the "tuck procedure", whereby a 12 mm corneo-scleral donor graft is taken and trimmed at its outer edges. A host pocket is formed at the limbal margin and the donor tissue is "tucked" into the host pocket.

== Prognosis ==
Keratoglobus prognosis continues to be variable, but it can be successfully managed with a variety of clinical and surgical techniques. The patient is at risk for globe perforation because the thinned out cornea is extremely weak.

== Epidemiology ==
It is a much rarer condition than keratoconus, which is the most common dystrophy of the cornea. Similar to keratoconus it is typically diagnosed in the patient's adolescent years and attains its most severe state in the twenties and thirties.
