= Munson's sign =

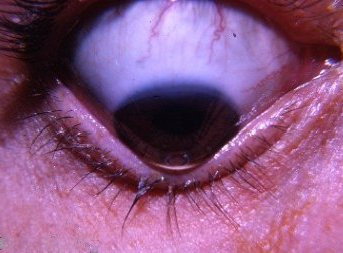
- Differential diagnosis: Keratoconus

Munson's sign is a V-shaped indentation observed in the lower eyelid when the patient's gaze is directed downwards. The medical sign is characteristic of advanced cases of keratoconus and is caused by the cone-shaped cornea pressing down into the eyelid.

It is named after American ophthalmologist Edwin Sterling Munson (born May 8, 1870 – died Feb. 2, 1958).
