= Journal of Refractive Surgery =

- Discipline: Ophthalmology
- Language: English
- Edited by: J. Bradley Randleman

Publication details
- Former names: Refractive & Corneal Surgery, Journal of Refractive & Corneal Surgery
- History: 1985-present
- Publisher: Slack
- Frequency: Monthly
- Open access: Hybrid
- Impact factor: 2.9 (2025)

Standard abbreviations
- ISO 4: J. Refract. Surg.

Indexing
- ISSN: 1081-597X (print); 1938-2391 (web)
- LCCN: 2008212573
- OCLC no.: 608152195
- Journal of Refractive Surgery (1985-1988)
- ISSN: 0883-0444
- Refractive & Corneal Surgery
- ISSN: 1042-962X
- Journal of Refractive & Corneal Surgery
- ISSN: 1081-0803

Links
- Journal homepage

The Journal of Refractive Surgery is a monthly peer-reviewed medical journal covering refractive and lens-based optical surgery. It is published by Slack and is the official journal of the International Society of Refractive Surgery, a partner of the American Academy of Ophthalmology.

== History ==
The journal was established in 1985 as the Journal of Refractive Surgery and renamed Refractive & Corneal Surgery in 1989. It was again renamed in 1994 as the Journal of Refractive & Corneal Surgery, then reverted to its original and current title in 1995.

== Abstracting and indexing ==
The journal is abstracted and indexed in:

- Current Contents/Clinical Medicine
- EBSCO databases
- Embase
- MEDLINE/PubMed
- ProQuest databases
- Science Citation Index Expanded
- Scopus
- Social Sciences Citation Index

According to the Journal Citation Reports, the journal has a 2025 impact factor of 2.9.
