= Corneal cross-linking =

Surgical procedure

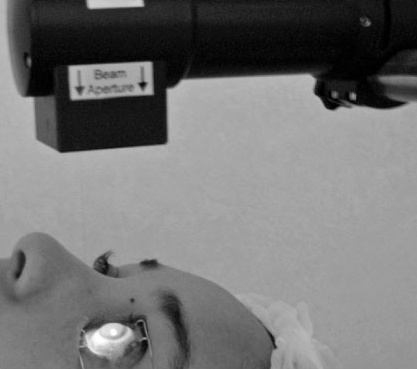
- Cross-linking procedure, UV light source
- Other names: Cross-linking, CXL, C3-R, CCL, KXL
- CPT: 0402T

Corneal cross-linking (CXL) with riboflavin (vitamin B_{2}) and UV-A light is a surgical treatment for corneal ectasia such as keratoconus, PMD, and post-LASIK ectasia.

It is used in an attempt to make the cornea stronger. According to a 2015 Cochrane review, there is insufficient evidence to determine if it is useful in keratoconus. In 2016, the US Food and Drug Administration approved riboflavin ophthalmic solution crosslinking based on three 12-month clinical trials.

== Medical uses ==
A 2015 Cochrane review found that the evidence on corneal cross-linking was insufficient to determine if it is an effective procedure for the treatment of keratoconus.

== Adverse effects ==
Among those with keratoconus who worsen, CXL may be used. In this group, the most common side effects are haziness of the cornea, punctate keratitis, corneal striae, corneal epithelium defect, and eye pain. In those who use it after post-LASIK ectasia, the most common side effects are haziness of the cornea, corneal epithelium defect, corneal striae, dry eye, eye pain, punctate keratitis, and sensitivity to bright lights.

There are no long-term studies about crosslinking effect on pregnancy and lactation. According to a manufacturer crosslinking should not be performed on pregnant women.

== Cautions ==
People undergoing crosslinking should not rub their eyes for the first five days after the procedure.

== Procedure ==
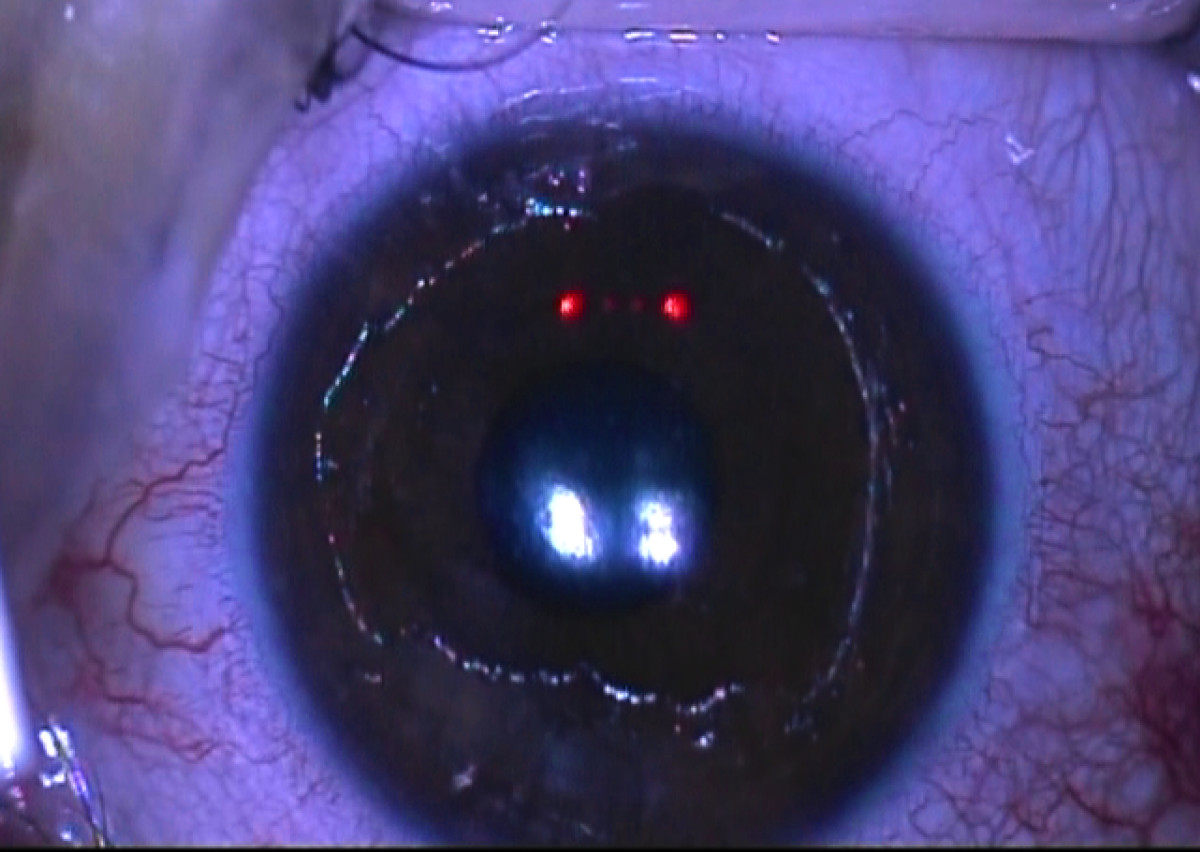
Removed corneal epithelium during CCR operation on an eye with post-LASIK complication, from Kymionis et al., 2009

Corneal cross-linking involves application of riboflavin solution to the eye that is activated by illumination with UV-A light for approximately 30 or fewer minutes. The riboflavin causes new bonds to form across adjacent collagen strands and proteoglycans in the stromal layer of the cornea, which recovers and preserves some of the cornea's mechanical strength. The corneal epithelial layer is generally removed to increase penetration of the riboflavin into the stroma, a procedure known as the Dresden protocol.

People that are considered for treatment must undergo an extensive clinical workup, including corneal tomography, computerized corneal topography, endothelial microscopy, ultrasound pachymetry, b-scan sonography, keratometry and biomicroscopy.

== History ==
The technique was first developed in Germany in 1997 by Theo Seiler and his team at the Dresden University of Technology.

== Approvals and clinical trials ==
In Germany, CXL has been used in patients with keratoconus since 1998, and in Italy, routine interventions have been successfully performed since 2005. The standard (Dresden) CXL protocol with epithelium removal, is approved for use throughout Europe.

In the United States, clinical trials commenced only in 2008. Based on three 12-month clinical trials, the US Food and Drug Administration approved riboflavin ophthalmic solution and Avedro's KXL system for crosslinking on 18 April 2016, for the treatment of progressive keratoconus, and on 19 July 2016, for corneal ectasia after refractive surgery, making them the first FDA approved treatment for keratoconus and post-LASIK ectasia.

== Research ==
Research studying the safety and efficacy of corneal cross-linking is ongoing.

Transepithelial or epithelium-on (epi-on) cross-linking is a technique which was first performed in 2004 in the U.S., the corneal epithelium layer is left intact. in this technique, because the epithelium is not removed, riboflavin loading requires more time than with epi-off techniques, and may be less effective, as keratoconus progression may be more likely in epi-on procedures.

Contact lens-assisted cross-linking (CACXL) may be performed for people with corneal stromal thickness between 350 μm to 400 μm after epithelial removal. in this method a pre-corneal riboflavin film, a riboflavin-soaked UV barrier-free soft contact lens of negligible power and a pre-contact lens riboflavin film are used to decrease UV irradiance to safe levels at the level of the endothelium.

Topography-guided crosslinking relies on an active eye tracker to allow a patterned delivery of UV light. Both the power and pattern can be programmed into the unit based on the topography of the individual's eyes.

Accelerated crosslinking allows a shorter treatment time by delivering the same energy more quickly, compared to the standard crosslinking procedure, which involves 3 mW of UV-A exposure for 30 minutes. Some hospitals are using this accelerated CXL technique delivering a similar amount of UV-A energy in eight to ten minutes, following research showing the cornea may better tolerate this shorter burst of UV-A. However, a recent study using the real-world registry data showed that the standard (Dresden) CXL was associated with better visual and corneal curvature outcomes 5-years post-surgery.
