= Keratoconus =

Deformation of the eye's cornea into a conelike shape

- Other names: KC, KCN, conical cornea
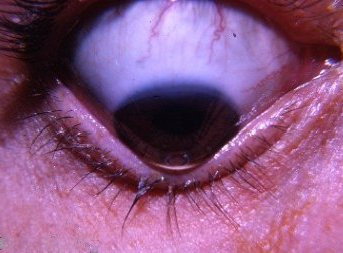
- The "cone shaped cornea" that is characteristic of Keratoconus
- Pronunciation: KEHR-uh- toh-KOH-nus
- Specialty: Ophthalmology, optometry
- Symptoms: Blurry vision, nearsightedness, light sensitivity
- Usual onset: Early adulthood
- Causes: Unknown
- Diagnostic method: Slit lamp exam
- Treatment: Glasses, contacts, surgery
- Frequency: ~1 in 2,000 people

Keratoconus is an eye disorder in which the cornea, the transparent front part of the eye, gradually thins and bulges outward into a cone shape. This causes distorted vision, including blurry vision, double vision, increased nearsightedness, irregular astigmatism, and light sensitivity, which can reduce quality of life. Both eyes are usually affected.

The cause is not fully understood but likely involves a combination of genetic, environmental, and hormonal factors. Having a parent, sibling, or child with keratoconus increases risk significantly. Environmental risk factors include frequent eye rubbing and allergies. Diagnosis is typically made with corneal topography, which maps the shape of the cornea and reveals characteristic changes.

In early stages, vision is often corrected with glasses or soft contact lenses. As the condition progresses, rigid or scleral contact lenses may be needed. In 2016, the FDA approved corneal collagen cross-linking to halt progression. If vision cannot be improved with contact lenses and the cornea becomes too thin or scarred, a corneal transplant may be necessary.

Keratoconus affects about 1 in 2,000 people, though some estimates suggest it may be as common as 1 in 400. It typically develops in late childhood or early adulthood and occurs in all populations, though it may be more common in some ethnic groups, such as people of Asian descent. The name comes from the Greek kéras (cornea) and Latin cōnus (cone).

== Signs and symptoms ==
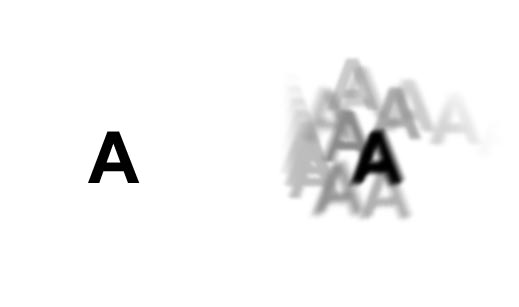
Simulation of the multiple images seen by a person with keratoconus. "... a candle, when looked at, appears like a number of lights, confusedly running into one another" — Nottingham

People with early keratoconus often notice a minor blurring or distortion of their vision, as well as an increased sensitivity to light, so they may visit their clinician seeking corrective lenses for reading or driving. At early stages, the symptoms of keratoconus may be no different from those of any other refractive defect of the eye. As the disease progresses, vision deteriorates, sometimes rapidly due to irregular astigmatism. Visual acuity becomes impaired at all distances, and night vision is often poor. Some individuals have vision in one eye that is markedly worse than the other eye. The disease is often bilateral though asymmetrical. Some develop photophobia (sensitivity to bright light), eye strain from squinting in order to read, or itching in the eye, but there is normally little or no sensation of pain. It may cause luminous objects to appear as cylindrical pipes with the same intensity at all points.

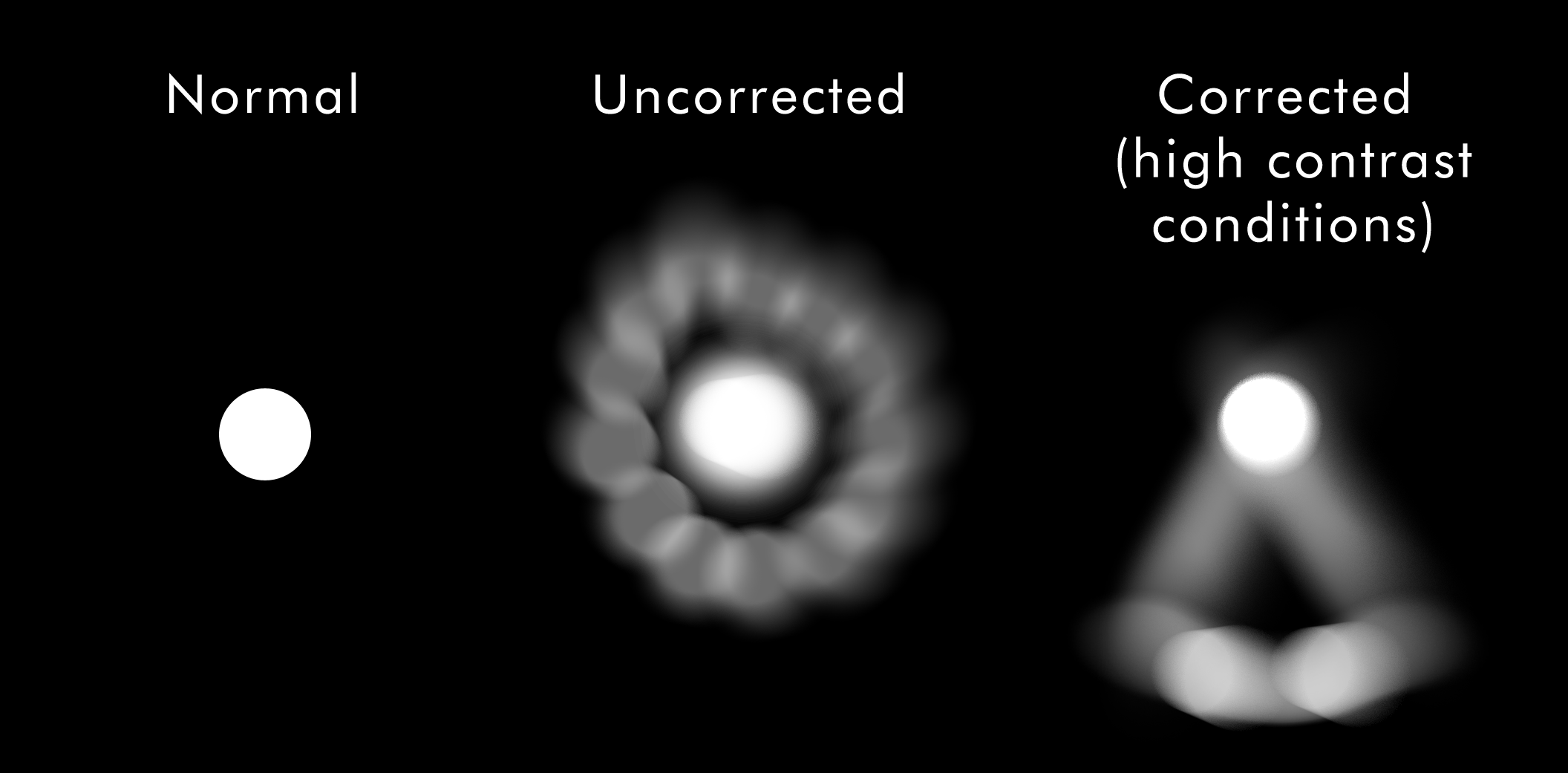
Multiple images made by extremely high contrast light sources as seen by a person with keratoconus

The classic symptom of keratoconus is the perception of multiple "ghost" images, known as monocular polyopia. This effect is most clearly seen with a high contrast field, such as a point of light on a dark background. Instead of seeing just one point, a person with keratoconus sees many images of the point, spread out in a chaotic pattern. This pattern does not typically change from day to day, but over time, it often takes on new forms. People also commonly notice streaking and flaring distortion around light sources. Some even notice the images moving relative to one another in time with their heartbeat. The predominant optical aberration of the eye in keratoconus is coma. The visual distortion experienced by the person comes from two sources, one being the irregular deformation of the surface of the cornea, and the other being scarring that occurs on its exposed highpoints. These factors act to form regions on the cornea that map an image to different locations on the retina. The effect can worsen in low light conditions, as the dark-adapted pupil dilates to expose more of the irregular surface of the cornea. Significant retinal layer thickness reduction is observed in keratoconus, especially in younger patients (<30 years).

== Genetics ==
Six genes have been found to be associated with the condition. These genes include BANP-ZNF469, COL4A4, FOXO1, FNDC3B, IMMP2L and RXRA-COL5A1. Others likely also exist.

Patients with a parent, sibling, or child who has keratoconus have 15 to 67 times higher risk in developing corneal ectasia compared to patients with no affected relatives.

== Pathophysiology ==
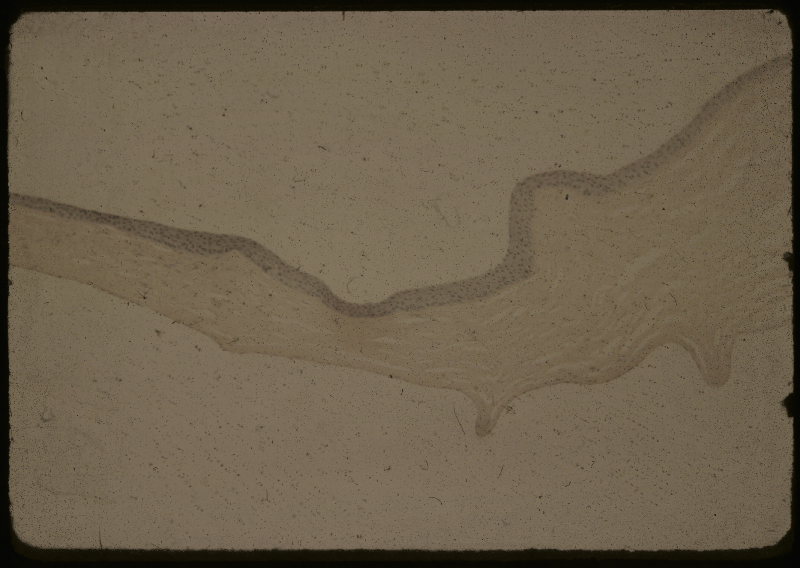
A specimen of keratoconic cornea taken out six years after diagnosis: thin stroma, wrinkled posterior surface

Despite considerable research, the cause of keratoconus remains unclear. Several sources suggest that keratoconus likely arises from a number of different factors: genetic, environmental or cellular, any of which may form the trigger for the onset of the disease. Once initiated, the disease normally develops by progressive dissolution of Bowman's layer, which lies between the corneal epithelium and stroma. As the two come into contact, cellular and structural changes in the cornea adversely affect its integrity and lead to the bulging and scarring characteristic of the disorder. Within any individual keratoconic cornea, regions of degenerative thinning coexisting with regions undergoing wound healing may be found. Scarring appears to be an aspect of the corneal degradation; however, a recent, large, multicenter study suggests abrasion by contact lenses may increase the likelihood of this finding by a factor over two.

A number of studies have indicated keratoconic corneas show signs of increased activity by proteases, a class of enzymes that break some of the collagen cross-linkages in the stroma, with a simultaneous reduced expression of protease inhibitors. Other studies have suggested that reduced activity by the enzyme aldehyde dehydrogenase may be responsible for a build-up of free radicals and oxidising species in the cornea. Whatever the pathogenetical process, the damage caused by activity within the cornea likely results in a reduction in its thickness and biomechanical strength. At an ultrastructural level the weakening of the corneal tissue is associated with a disruption of the regular arrangement of the collagen layers and collagen fibril orientation. While keratoconus is considered a noninflammatory disorder, one study shows wearing rigid contact lenses by people leads to overexpression of proinflammatory cytokines, such as IL-6, TNF-alpha, ICAM-1, and VCAM-1 in the tear fluid.

A genetic predisposition to keratoconus has been observed, with the disease running in certain families, and incidences reported of concordance in identical twins. The frequency of occurrence in close family members is not clearly defined, though it is known to be considerably higher than that in the general population, and studies have obtained estimates ranging between 6% and 19%. Two studies involving isolated, largely homogenetic communities have contrarily mapped putative gene locations to chromosomes 16q and 20q. Most genetic studies agree on an autosomal dominant model of inheritance. A rare, autosomal dominant form of severe keratoconus with anterior polar cataract is caused by a mutation in the seed region of mir-184, a microRNA that is highly expressed in the cornea and anterior lens. Keratoconus is diagnosed more often in people with Down's syndrome, though the reasons for this link have not yet been determined.

Researches also have shed light on the role of hormones in the pathophysiology of keratoconus. Hormones such as androgen, prolactin, estrogen and progesterone have been shown to influence corneal biomechanics and tissue remodeling, potentially affecting the integrity of the cornea in individuals predisposed to keratoconus. Moreover, fluctuations in hormonal levels during puberty and pregnancy have been associated with the onset or exacerbation of keratoconus in some cases.

Keratoconus has been associated with atopic diseases, which include asthma, allergies, and eczema, and it is not uncommon for several or all of these diseases to affect one person. Keratoconus is also associated with Alport syndrome, Down syndrome and Marfan syndrome. A number of studies suggest vigorous eye rubbing contributes to the progression of keratoconus, and people should be discouraged from the practice. Keratoconus differs from ectasia, which is caused by LASIK eye surgery. Post-LASIK Ectasia has been associated with the excessive removal of the eye's stromal bed tissue during surgery.

== Diagnosis ==
A schematic diagram showing change in cornea

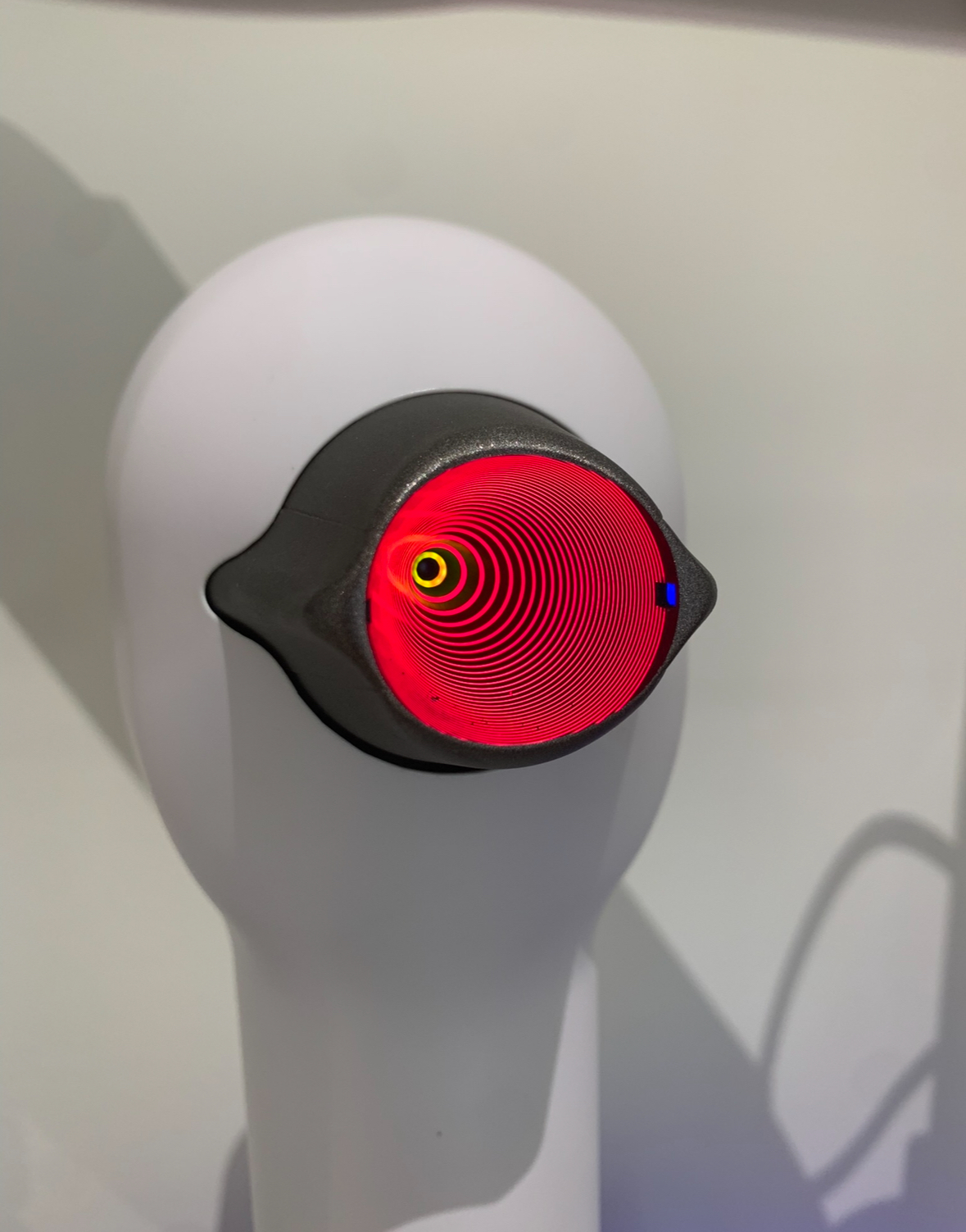
Corneal topographer, used for mapping the surface curvature of the cornea

Prior to any physical examination, the diagnosis of keratoconus frequently begins with an ophthalmologist's or optometrist's assessment of the person's medical history, particularly the chief complaint and other visual symptoms, the presence of any history of ocular disease or injury that might affect vision, and the presence of any family history of ocular disease. An eye chart, such as a standard Snellen chart of progressively smaller letters, is then used to determine the person's visual acuity. The eye examination may proceed to measurement of the localized curvature of the cornea with a manual keratometer, with detection of irregular astigmatism suggesting a possibility of keratoconus. Severe cases can exceed the instrument's measuring ability. A further indication can be provided by retinoscopy, in which a light beam is focused on the person's retina and the reflection, or reflex, observed as the examiner tilts the light source back and forth. Keratoconus is amongst the ophthalmic conditions that exhibit a scissor reflex action of two bands moving toward and away from each other like the blades of a pair of scissors.

If keratoconus is suspected, the ophthalmologist or optometrist will search for other characteristic findings of the disease by means of slit lamp examination of the cornea. An advanced case is usually readily apparent to the examiner, and can provide for an unambiguous diagnosis prior to more specialized testing. Under close examination, a ring of yellow-brown to olive-green pigmentation known as a Fleischer ring can be observed in around half of keratoconic eyes. The Fleischer ring, caused by deposition of the iron oxide hemosiderin within the corneal epithelium, is subtle and may not be readily detectable in all cases, but becomes more evident when viewed under a cobalt blue filter. Similarly, around 50% of subjects exhibit Vogt's striae, fine stress lines within the cornea caused by stretching and thinning. The striae temporarily disappear while slight pressure is applied to the eyeball. A highly pronounced cone can create a V-shaped indentation in the lower eyelid when the person's gaze is directed downwards, known as Munson's sign. Other clinical signs of keratoconus will normally have presented themselves long before Munson's sign becomes apparent, and so this finding, though a classic sign of the disease, tends not to be of primary diagnostic importance.

A handheld keratoscope, sometimes known as "Placido's disk", can provide a simple noninvasive visualization of the surface of the cornea by projecting a series of concentric rings of light onto the cornea. A more definitive diagnosis can be obtained using corneal topography, in which an automated instrument projects the illuminated pattern onto the cornea and determines its topography from analysis of the digital image. The topographical map indicates any distortions or scarring in the cornea, with keratoconus revealed by a characteristic steepening of curvature that is usually below the centerline of the eye. The technique can record a snapshot of the degree and extent of the deformation as a benchmark for assessing its rate of progression. It is of particular value in detecting the disorder in its early stages when other signs have not yet presented.

=== Stages ===
Corneal topography showing stage II keratoconus

Once keratoconus has been diagnosed, its degree may be classified by several metrics:

- The steepness of greatest curvature from 'mild' (< 45 D), 'advanced' (up to 52 D) or 'severe' (> 52 D);
- The morphology of the cone: 'nipple' (small: 5 mm and near-central), 'oval' (larger, below-center and often sagging), or 'globus' (more than 75% of cornea affected);
- The corneal thickness from mild (> 506 μm) to advanced (< 446 μm).

Increasing use of corneal topography has led to a decline in use of these terms.

Stage	Characteristics
Stage 1	Eccentric steepening Induced myopia and/or astigmatism of ≤ 5.0 D; K-reading ≤ 48.00 D; Vogt's lines, typical topography
Stage 2	Induced myopia and/or astigmatism between 5.00 and 8.00 D; K-reading ≤ 53.00 D; Pachymetry ≥ 400 μm
Stage 3	Induced myopia and/or astigmatism between 8.01 and 10.00 D; K-reading > 53.00 D; Pachymetry 200 to 400 μm
Stage 4	Refraction not measurable; K-reading > 55.00 D; Central scars; Pachymetry ≤ 200 μm
Stage is determined if one of the characteristics applies. Corneal thickness is the thinnest measured spot of the cornea.

== Treatment ==
=== Lenses ===
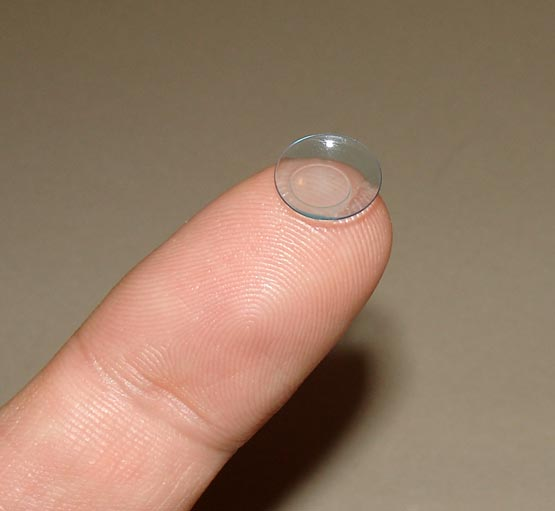
Rigid gas permeable (RGP) lens

In early stages of keratoconus, glasses or soft contact lenses can suffice to correct for the mild astigmatism. As the condition progresses, these may no longer provide the person with a satisfactory degree of visual acuity, and most practitioners will move to manage the condition with rigid contact lenses, known as rigid, gas-permeable, (RGP) lenses. RGP lenses provide a good level of visual correction, but do not arrest progression of the condition.

In people with keratoconus, rigid contact lenses improve vision by means of tear fluid filling the gap between the irregular corneal surface and the smooth regular inner surface of the lens, thereby creating the effect of a smoother cornea. Many specialized types of contact lenses have been developed for keratoconus, and affected people may seek out both doctors specialized in conditions of the cornea, and contact lens fitters who have experience managing people with keratoconus. The irregular cone presents a challenge and the fitter will endeavor to produce a lens with the optimal contact, stability and steepness. Some trial-and-error fitting may prove necessary.

==== Hybrid lenses ====
Traditionally, contact lenses for keratoconus have been the 'hard' or RGP variety, although manufacturers have also produced specialized 'soft' or hydrophilic lenses and, most recently, silicone hydrogel lenses. A soft lens has a tendency to conform to the conical shape of the cornea, thus diminishing its effect. To counter this, hybrid lenses have been developed that are hard in the centre and encompassed by a soft skirt. However, soft or earlier generation hybrid lenses did not prove effective for every person. Early generation lenses have been discontinued. The fourth generation of hybrid lens technology has improved, giving more people an option that combines the comfort of a soft lens with the visual acuity of an RGP lens.

==== Scleral lenses ====
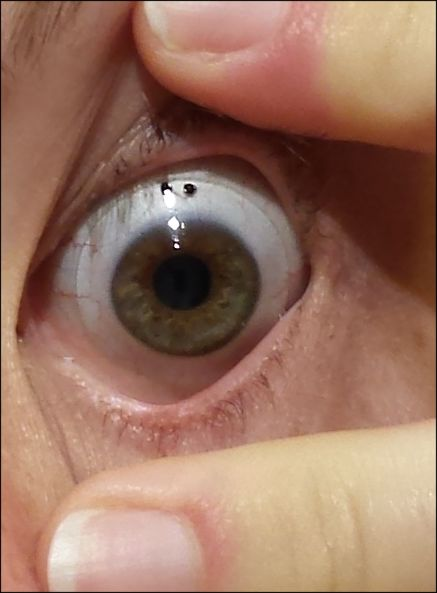
Scleral lens

Scleral lenses are sometimes prescribed for cases of advanced or very irregular keratoconus; these lenses cover a greater proportion of the surface of the eye and hence can offer improved stability. Easier handling can find favor with people with reduced dexterity, such as the elderly.

==== Piggybacking ====
Some people find good vision correction and comfort with a "piggyback" lens combination, in which RGP lenses are worn over soft lenses, both providing a degree of vision correction. One form of piggyback lens makes use of a soft lens with a countersunk central area to accept the rigid lens. Fitting a piggyback lens combination requires experience on the part of the lens fitter, and tolerance on the part of the person with keratoconus.

=== Surgery ===
==== Corneal transplant ====
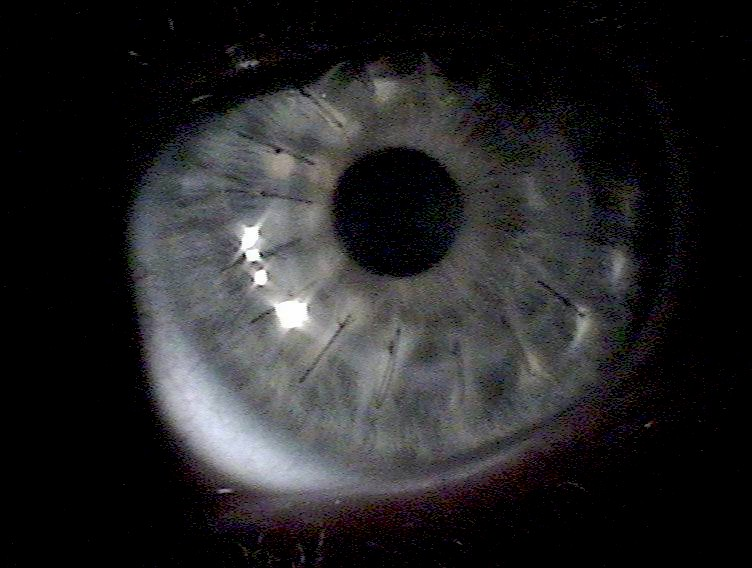
Corneal transplant for keratoconus, approximately one week after surgery – multiple light reflections indicate folds in the cornea that later resolved

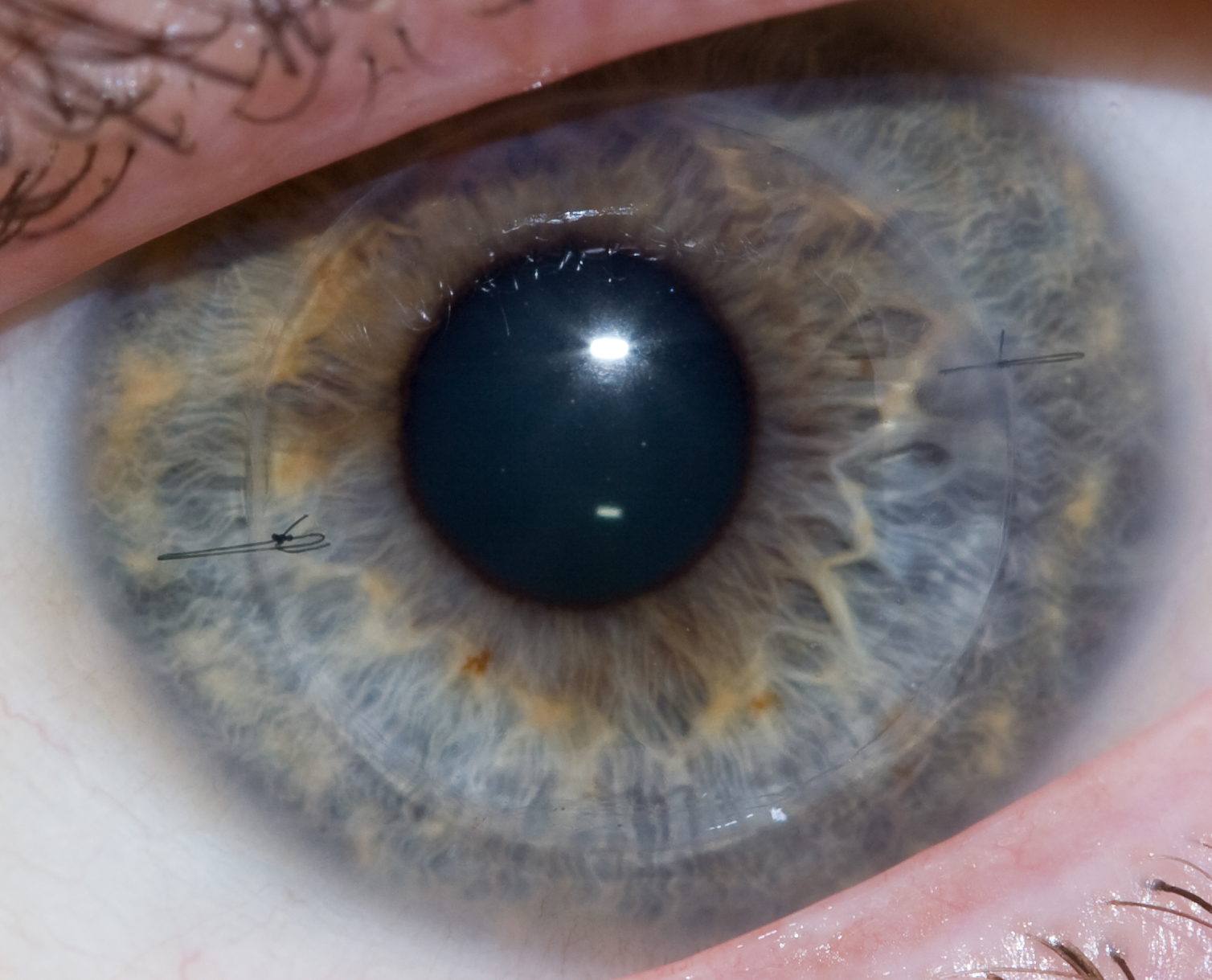
Cornea transplant after one year of healing; two stitches are visible

Between 11% and 27% of cases of keratoconus will progress to a point where vision correction is no longer possible, thinning of the cornea becomes excessive, or scarring as a result of contact lens wear causes problems of its own, and a corneal transplantation or penetrating keratoplasty becomes required. Keratoconus is the most common grounds for conducting a penetrating keratoplasty, generally accounting for around a quarter of such procedures. The corneal transplant surgeon trephines a lenticule of corneal tissue and then grafts the donor cornea to the existing eye tissue, usually using a combination of running and individual sutures. The cornea does not have a direct blood supply, so the donor tissue is not required to be blood type matched. Eye banks check the donor corneas for any disease or cellular irregularities.

The acute recovery period can take four to six weeks, and full postoperative vision stabilization often takes a year or more, but most transplants are very stable in the long term. The National Keratoconus Foundation reports that penetrating keratoplasty has the most successful outcome of all transplant procedures, and when performed for keratoconus in an otherwise healthy eye, its success rate can be 95% or greater. The sutures used usually dissolve over a period of three to five years, but individual sutures can be removed during the healing process if they are causing irritation to the person.

In the US, corneal transplants (also known as corneal grafts) for keratoconus are usually performed under sedation as outpatient surgery. In other countries, such as Australia and the UK, the operation is commonly performed with the person undergoing a general anaesthetic. All cases require a careful follow-up with an eye doctor (ophthalmologist or optometrist) for a number of years. Frequently, vision is greatly improved after the surgery, but even if the actual visual acuity does not improve, because the cornea is a more normal shape after the healing is completed, people can more easily be fitted with corrective lenses. Complications of corneal transplants are mostly related to vascularization of the corneal tissue and rejection of the donor cornea. Vision loss is very rare, though difficult-to-correct vision is possible. When rejection is severe, repeat transplants are often attempted, and are frequently successful. Keratoconus will not normally reoccur in the transplanted cornea; incidences of this have been observed, but are usually attributed to incomplete excision of the original cornea or inadequate screening of the donor tissue. The long-term outlook for corneal transplants performed for keratoconus is usually favorable once the initial healing period is completed and a few years have elapsed without problems.

One way of reducing the risk of rejection is to use a technique called deep anterior lamellar keratoplasty (DALK). In a DALK graft, only the outermost epithelium and the main bulk of the cornea, the stroma, are replaced; the person's rearmost endothelium layer and the Descemet's membrane are left, giving some additional structural integrity to the postgraft cornea. Furthermore, it is possible to transplant freeze-dried donor tissue. The freeze-drying process ensures this tissue is dead, so there is no chance of rejection. Research from two trials in Iran provide low to moderate evidence that graft rejection is more likely to occur in penetrating keratoplasty than in DALK, though the likelihood for graft failure were similar with both procedures.

===== Epikeratophakia =====
Rarely, a nonpenetrating keratoplasty known as an epikeratophakia (or epikeratoplasty) may be performed in cases of keratoconus. The corneal epithelium is removed and a lenticule of donor cornea is grafted on top of it. The procedure requires a greater level of skill on the part of the surgeon, and is less frequently performed than a penetrating keratoplasty, as the outcome is generally less favorable. However, it may be seen as an option in a number of cases, particularly for young people.

==== Corneal ring implants ====
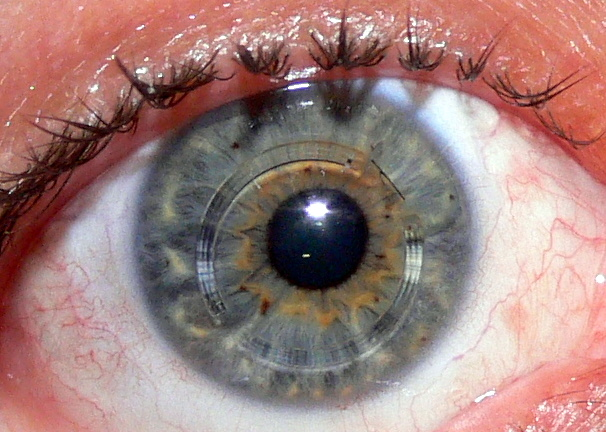
A pair of Intacs after insertion into the cornea

A possible surgical alternative to corneal transplant is the insertion of intrastromal corneal ring segments. A small incision is made in the periphery of the cornea and two thin arcs of polymethyl methacrylate are slid between the layers of the stroma on either side of the pupil before the incision is closed by a suture. The segments push out against the curvature of the cornea, flattening the peak of the cone and returning it to a more natural shape. The procedure offers the benefit of being reversible and even potentially exchangeable as it involves no removal of eye tissue.

Corneal intrastromal implantation surgery involving the implantation of a full ring is also available as a treatment option for keratoconus. Evidence supports that the full-ring implant improves vision outcomes for at least a year.

==== Corneal Allogenic Intrastromal Ring Segments (CAIRS) ====
Corneal Allogenic Intrastromal Ring Segments Keratoplasty (CAIRS Keratoplasty) represent an innovative surgical approach for the management of keratoconus, utilizing donor corneal tissue as biocompatible implants to reshape the ectatic cornea and improve visual acuity. CAIRS is a corneal transplant and due to its success rate, efficacy, safety profile and use of biologic tissue, it been recognised as such by funding bodies in Australia, the United Kingdom, Brazil, Japan, the Netherlands, Germany and numerous other countries. Unlike traditional synthetic intrastromal corneal ring segments (ICRS), which are typically made from polymethyl methacrylate (PMMA), CAIRS keratoplasty employs preserved allogeneic donor cornea to minimize risks such as extrusion, infection, or foreign body reactions associated with non-biological materials.

The technique was developed by Soosan Jacob, who first described CAIRS in 2018 in a prospective interventional case series published in the Journal of Refractive Surgery. In this study, 24 eyes of 20 patients with keratoconus (grades 2–4) underwent CAIRS implantation combined with accelerated corneal collagen cross-linking (CXL). The procedure involved femtosecond laser-assisted creation of intrastromal tunnels followed by insertion of custom-cut allogeneic segments. Key outcomes included significant improvements in uncorrected distance visual acuity (UDVA) of 2.79 ± 2.65 lines and corrected distance visual acuity (CDVA) of 1.29 ± 1.33. No intraoperative or postoperative complications were reported, highlighting the procedure's safety profile.

CAIRS keratoplasty is particularly advantageous for asymmetric or decentered cones, where customized segment shapes can be tailored to optimize corneal flattening and astigmatism correction. Subsequent studies have validated its efficacy in other types of corneal ectasia, with long-term stability observed up to 5 years. Soosan Jacob holds patents for specialized trephines and devices facilitating CAIRS implantation, further advancing its precision and reproducibility.

The ability to customise CAIRS keratoplasty segments to achieve better vision for patients with irregular topography is a huge advantage of the procedure.

Some companies have trademarked commercial names for pre-prepared commercial segments such as "CTAK". These procedures are still a CAIRS keratoplasty procedures but the provision of the tissue has been given a brand name for marketing and awareness purposes.

An online surgical planning tool has been developed by keratoconus specialists from Brisbane in Australia, Dr Brendan Cronin and Dr David Gunn. This site www.cairsplan.com is free and provides surgeons a tool to assist in planning their CAIRS keratoplasty procedures to enhance outcomes.

==== Cross-linking ====
Corneal collagen cross-linking is a developing treatment that aims to strengthen the cornea, however, according to a 2015 Cochrane review, there is insufficient evidence to determine if it is useful in keratoconus. In 2016, however, the FDA approved cross-linking surgery as a treatment for keratoconus and recommended that a registry system should be set-up to evaluate the long-term treatment effect. The Save Sight Keratoconus Registry is an international database of keratoconus patients that is tracking outcomes of cross-linking in patients with keratoconus.

==== Keratotomy ====
Diagram of MARK incisions

Keratotomies are a group of corneal procedures. Radial keratotomy is a refractive surgery procedure where the surgeon makes a spoke-like pattern of incisions into the cornea to modify its shape. This early surgical option for myopia has been largely superseded by PRK, LASIK and other similar laser procedures. Laser surgery is usually contraindicated in keratoconus and other corneal thinning conditions, as removal of corneal stromal tissue will further damage an already thin and weak cornea. For similar reasons, radial keratotomy has also generally not been used for people with keratoconus.

However, more modern and keratoconus-specific variants, such as Mini asymmetric radial keratotomy (MARK) and Circular keratotomy (CK), have been found to be useful in keratoconus management, particularly when combined with Corneal cross-linking.

== Prognosis ==
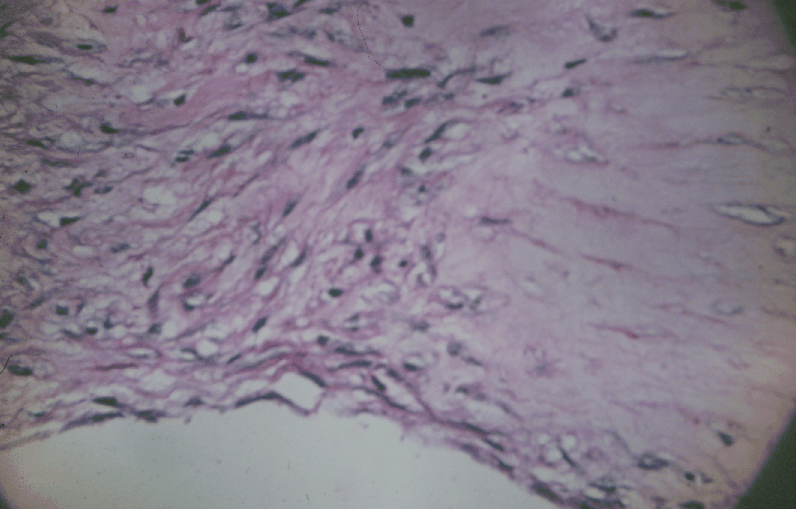
A small rupture of Descemet's membrane (magnified view)

Patients with keratoconus typically present initially with mild astigmatism and myopia, commonly at the onset of puberty, and are diagnosed by the late teenage years or early 20s. The disease can, however, present or progress at any age; in rare cases, keratoconus can present in children or not until later adulthood. A diagnosis of the disease at an early age may indicate a greater risk of severity in later life. Patients' vision will seem to fluctuate over a period of months, driving them to change lens prescriptions frequently, but as the condition worsens, contact lenses are required in the majority of cases. The course of the disorder can be quite variable, with some patients remaining stable for years or indefinitely, while others progress rapidly or experience occasional exacerbations over a long and otherwise steady course. Most commonly, keratoconus progresses for a period of 10 to 20 years before the course of the disease generally ceases in the third and fourth decades of life.

=== Corneal hydrops ===
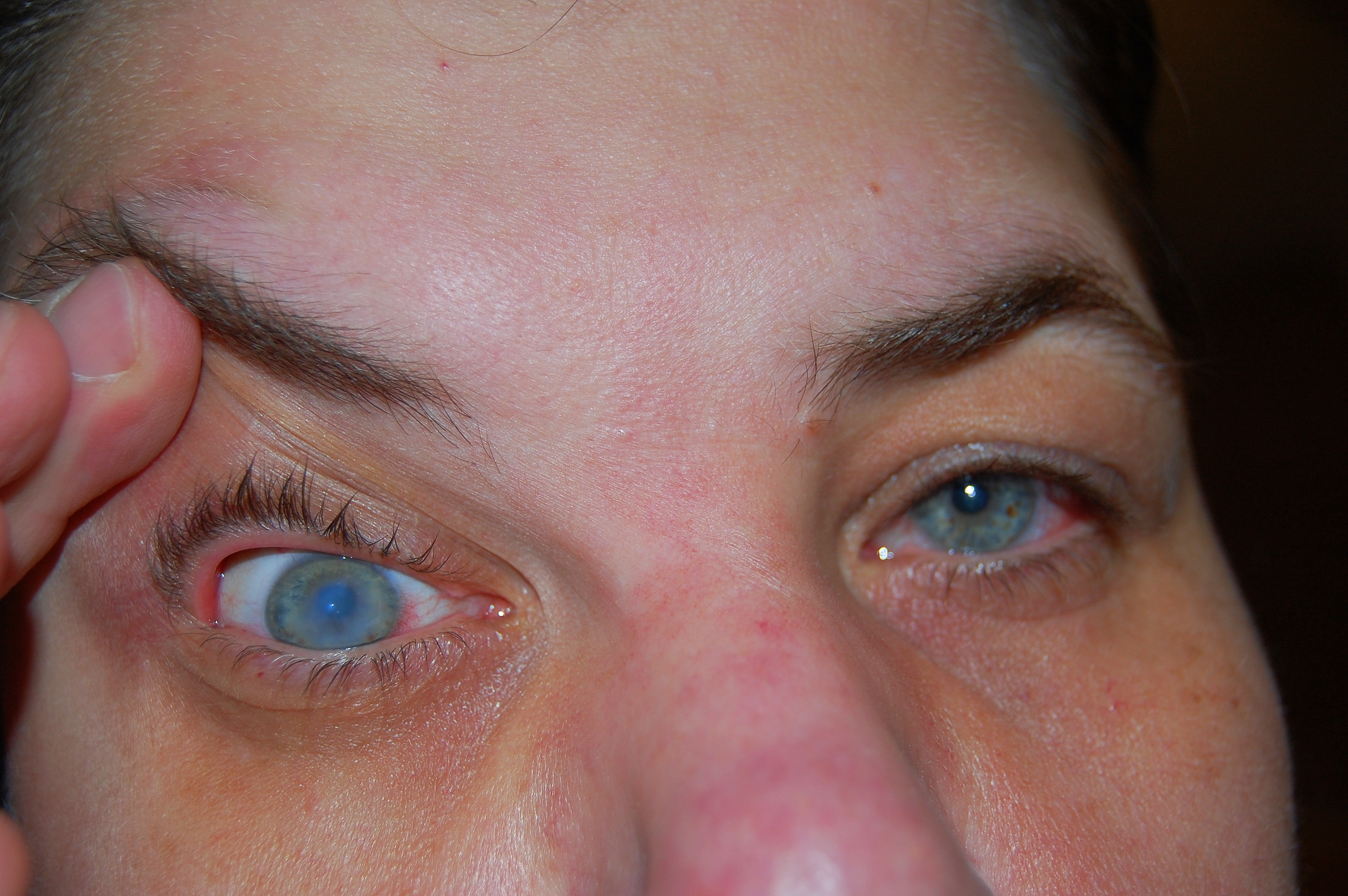
Corneal hydrops due to keratoconus

In advanced cases, bulging of the cornea can result in a localized rupture of Descemet's membrane, an inner layer of the cornea. Aqueous humor from the eye's anterior chamber seeps into the cornea before Descemet's membrane reseals. The patient experiences pain and a sudden severe clouding of vision, with the cornea taking on a translucent milky-white appearance known as a corneal hydrops.

Although disconcerting to the patient, the effect is normally temporary and after a period of six to eight weeks, the cornea usually returns to its former transparency. The recovery can be aided nonsurgically by bandaging with an osmotic saline solution. Although a hydrops usually causes increased scarring of the cornea, occasionally it will benefit a patient by creating a flatter cone, aiding the fitting of contact lenses. Corneal transplantation is not usually indicated during corneal hydrops.

== Epidemiology ==
The National Eye Institute reports keratoconus is the most common corneal dystrophy in the United States, affecting about one in 2,000 Americans, but some reports place the figure as high as one in 500. In the pediatric populations, ages three to 18, the prevalence of keratoconus was found to be as high as one in 334 children. The inconsistency may be due to variations in diagnostic criteria, with some cases of severe astigmatism interpreted as those of keratoconus, and vice versa. A long-term study found a mean incidence rate of 2.0 new cases per 100,000 population per year. Some studies have suggested a higher prevalence amongst females, or that people of South Asian ethnicity are 4.4 times as likely to develop keratoconus as Caucasians, and are also more likely to be affected with the condition earlier.

Keratoconus is normally bilateral (affecting both eyes) although the distortion is usually asymmetric and is rarely completely identical in both corneas. Unilateral cases tend to be uncommon, and may in fact be very rare if a very mild condition in the better eye is simply below the limit of clinical detection. It is common for keratoconus to be diagnosed first in one eye and not until later in the other. As the condition then progresses in both eyes, the vision in the earlier-diagnosed eye will often remain poorer than that in its fellow.

== History ==
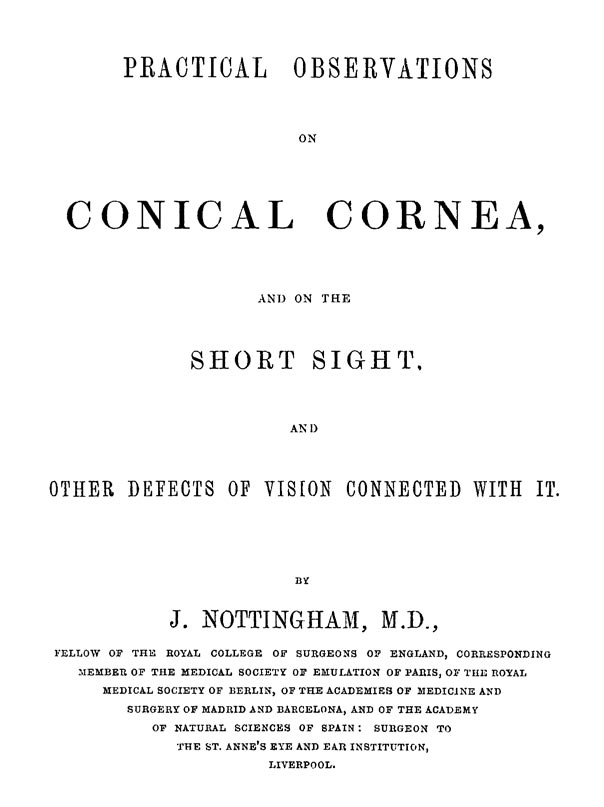
Practical observations on conical cornea, Nottingham's ground-breaking text on keratoconus, 1854

The German oculist Burchard Mauchart provided an early description in a 1748 doctoral dissertation of a case of keratoconus, which he called staphyloma diaphanum. However, it was not until 1854 that British physician John Nottingham (1801–1856) clearly described keratoconus and distinguished it from other ectasias of the cornea. Nottingham reported the cases of "conical cornea" that had come to his attention, and described several classic features of the disease, including polyopia, weakness of the cornea, and difficulty matching corrective lenses to the patient's vision. In 1859, British surgeon William Bowman used an ophthalmoscope (recently invented by Hermann von Helmholtz) to diagnose keratoconus, and described how to angle the instrument's mirror so as to best see the conical shape of the cornea. Bowman also attempted to restore vision by pulling on the iris with a fine hook inserted through the cornea and stretching the pupil into a vertical slit, like that of a cat. He reported that he had had a measure of success with the technique, restoring vision to an 18-year-old woman who had previously been unable to count fingers at a distance of 8 inches (20 cm).

By 1869, when the pioneering Swiss ophthalmologist Johann Horner wrote a thesis entitled On the treatment of keratoconus, the disorder had acquired its current name. The treatment at that time, endorsed by the leading German ophthalmologist Albrecht von Graefe, was an attempt to physically reshape the cornea by chemical cauterization with a silver nitrate solution and application of a miosis-causing agent with a pressure dressing. In 1888, the treatment of keratoconus became one of the first practical applications of the then newly invented contact lens, when the French physician Eugène Kalt manufactured a glass scleral shell that improved vision by compressing the cornea into a more regular shape. Since the start of the 20th century, research on keratoconus has both improved understanding of the disease and greatly expanded the range of treatment options. The first successful corneal transplantation to treat keratoconus was done in 1936 by Ramón Castroviejo.

== Society and culture ==
According to the findings of the Collaborative Longitudinal Evaluation of Keratoconus (CLEK), people who have keratoconus could be expected to pay more than $25,000 over their lifetime post-diagnosis, with a standard deviation of $19,396. There is limited evidence on the costs of corneal cross-linking, a cost-effectiveness study estimated the costs of the total treatment for one person as £928 ($1,392 U.S.) in the UK National Health Service, but this may be as high as $6,500 per eye in other countries. A 2013 cost-benefit analysis by the Lewin Group for Eye Bank Association of America, estimated an average cost of $16,500 for each corneal transplant.

=== Notable individuals with keratoconus ===
The following individuals have publicly stated they have keratoconus:

- Stephen Curry, American basketball player
- Ashton Irwin, Australian musician
- Mandy Patinkin, American actor
- Michaela Strachan, British TV presenter
- Tetsuo Hara, Japanese manga artist

== Related disorders ==
Several other corneal ectatic disorders also cause thinning of the cornea:

- Keratoglobus is a very rare condition that causes corneal thinning primarily at the margins, resulting in a spherical, slightly enlarged eye. It may be genetically related to keratoconus.
- Pellucid marginal degeneration causes thinning of a narrow (1–2 mm) band of the cornea, usually along the inferior corneal margin. It causes irregular astigmatism that, in the early stages of the disease can be corrected by spectacles. Differential diagnosis may be made by slit-lamp examination.
- Posterior keratoconus, a distinct disorder despite its similar name, is a rare abnormality, usually congenital, which causes a nonprogressive thinning of the inner surface of the cornea, while the curvature of the anterior surface remains normal. Usually only a single eye is affected.
- Post-LASIK ectasia is a complication of LASIK eye surgery.
