= Keratometer =

Diagnostic instrument used to assess the extent and axis of astigmatism

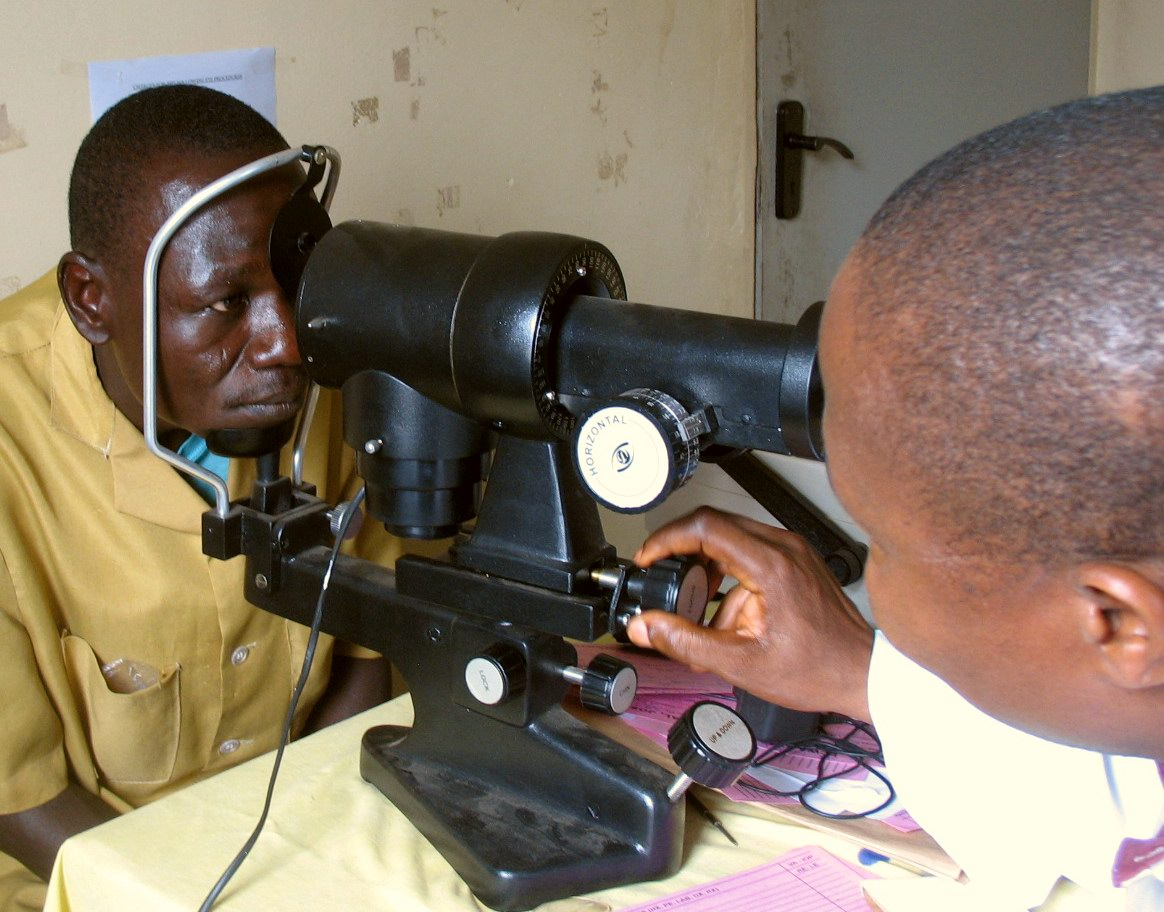
An eye doctor examining a patient with a keratometer

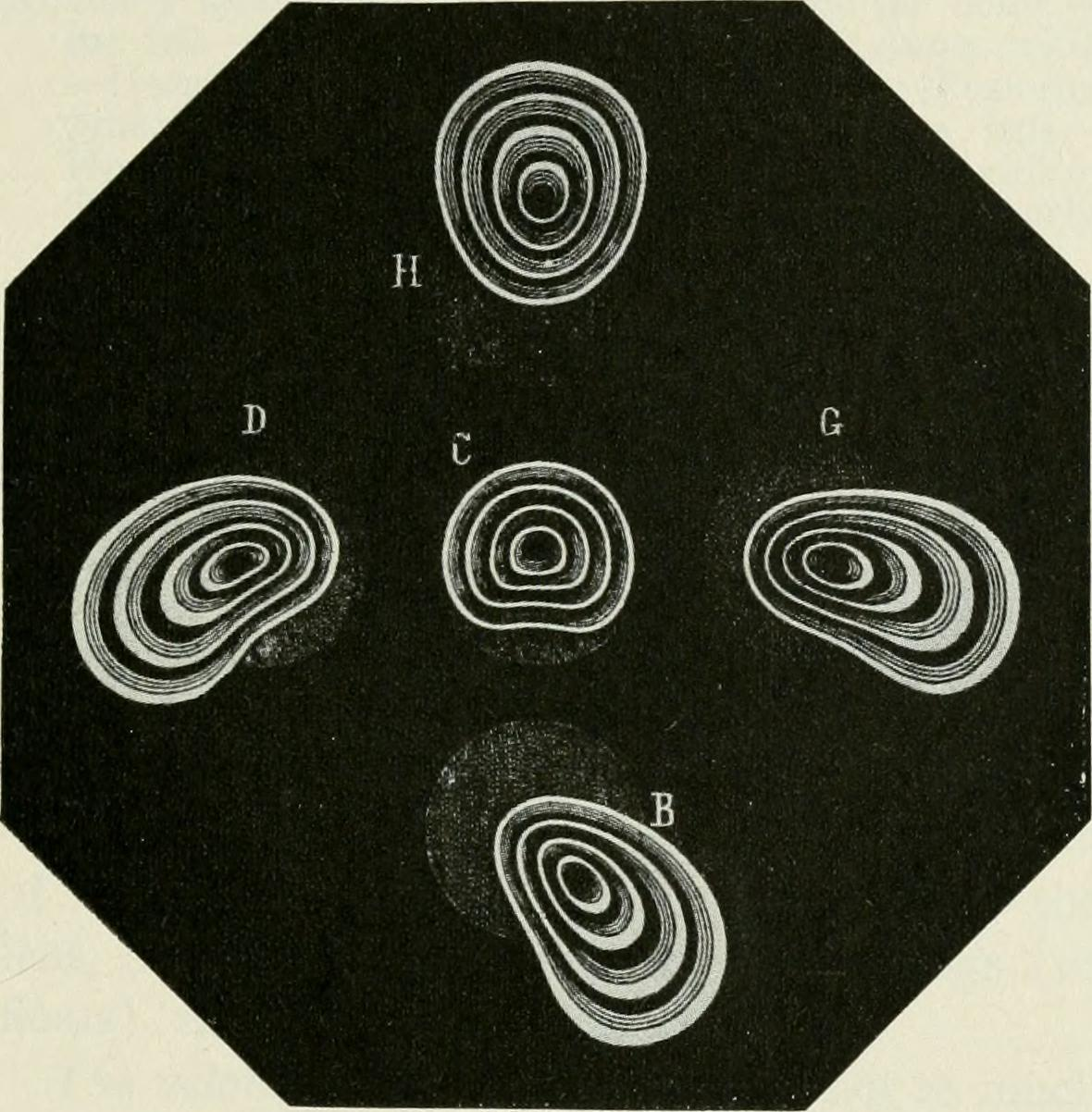
Typical presentations of keratoconus as detected through a keratometer

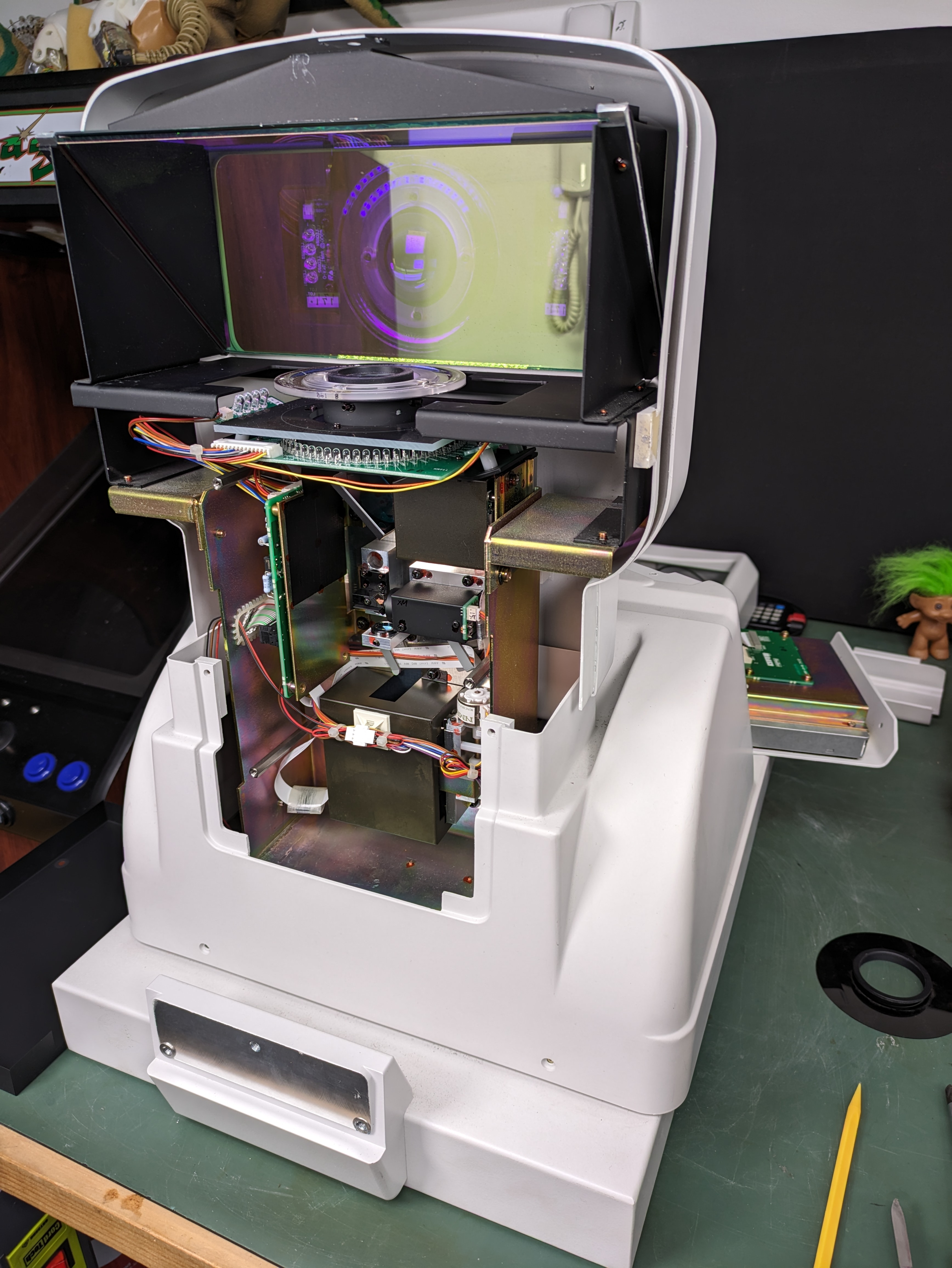
Shin Nippon Nvision K-5001 Refkeratometer

A keratometer, also known as an ophthalmometer, is a diagnostic instrument for measuring the curvature of the anterior surface of the cornea, particularly for assessing the extent and axis of astigmatism. It was invented by the German physiologist Hermann von Helmholtz in 1851, although an earlier model was developed in 1796 by Jesse Ramsden and Everard Home.

A keratometer uses the relationship between object size (O), image size (I), the distance between the reflective surface and the object (d), and the radius of the reflective surface (R). If three of these variables are known (or fixed), the fourth can be calculated using the formula

$$R = 2d \frac{I}{O}$$

There are two distinct variants of determining R; Javal-Schiotz type keratometers have a fixed image size and are typically 'two position', whereas Bausch and Lomb type keratometers have a fixed object size and are usually 'one position'.

== Javal-Schiotz Principles ==
The Javal-Schiotz keratometer is a two position instrument which uses a fixed image and doubling size and adjustable object size to determine the radius of curvature of the reflective surface. It uses two self illuminated mires (the object), one a red square, the other a green staircase design, which are held on a circumferential track in order to maintain a fixed distance from the eye. In order to get repeatable, accurate measurements, it is important that the instrument stays focused. It uses the Scheiner principle, common in autofocus devices, in which the converging reflected rays coming towards the eyepiece are viewed through (at least) two separate symmetrical apertures.

== Bausch and Lomb principles ==
The Bausch and Lomb Keratometer is a one position keratometer that gives readings in dioptric form. It differs from the Javal-Schiotz in that object size is fixed, image size is the manipulable variable. The reflected rays are passed through a Scheiner disc with 4 apertures – As there are two prisms, each aligned perpendicular to the other, the major and minor axis powers can be measured independently without adjusting the orientation of the instrument.

In converting the measurements obtained from the corneal surface into a dioptric value, the B&L keratometer uses the general lens formula (n'-n)/R and assumes an n' of 1.3375 (compared to the actual corneal refractive index of n'=1.376). This is a fictional value, which includes an allowance for the small, yet significant, negative power of the posterior corneal surface. This allows for a readout in both refractive power (dioptres) and radius of curvature (millimeters).
