= Intrastromal corneal ring segment =

Small device implanted in the eye to correct vision

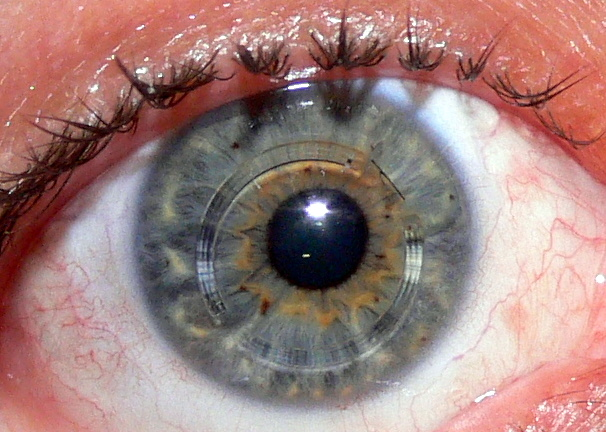
- A pair of corneal rings after insertion into the cornea
- Other names: Intrastromal corneal ring
- Specialty: Ophthalmology

An intrastromal corneal ring segment (ICRS) (also known as intrastromal corneal ring, corneal implant or corneal insert) is a small device surgically implanted in the cornea of the eye to correct vision. Ring segments or a full ring are inserted between the layers of the corneal stroma, most commonly two rings are inserted, one on each side of the pupil, This is intended to flatten the cornea and change the refraction of light passing through the cornea on its way into the eye.

A newer approach to ICRS is Corneal Allogenic Ring Segments (CAIRS) which is a type of keratoplasty or corneal transplant. In this procedure human allogenic corneal tissue is implanted in the same way that ICRS are implanted. CAIRS keratoplasty has the advantage of few complications and typically better outcomes than traditional ICRS.

== Design ==
Intrastromal corneal ring segments have many different types and designs. Manufacturers include Intacs (US), Cornealring (Brazil), Mediphacos Keraring (Brazil), Ferrara ring (Brazil), Myoring (Austria) and Intraseg (UK).

== Medical uses ==
Intrastromal corneal rings were originally used to treat mild myopia. For this purpose, they have largely been superseded by excimer lasers, which have better accuracy. They are now mostly used to treat mild to moderate keratoconus. Intrastromal corneal rings were approved in 2004 by the Food and Drug Administration for people with keratoconus who cannot adequately correct their vision with glasses or contact lenses, and for whom corneal transplant is the only other option. They were approved under the Humanitarian Device Exemption, which means the manufacturer did not have to demonstrate effectiveness. According to the FDA, these products should not be used by people who "can achieve functional vision on a daily basis using contact lenses."
