= Anion exchanger family =

Anion Exchanger, bicarbonate transporter family

Identifiers
- Symbol: HCO3_cotransp
- InterPro: IPR003020
- PROSITE: PDOC00192
- TCDB: 2.A.31
Available protein structures:
- PDB: IPR003020
- AlphaFold: IPR003020

The anion exchanger family (TC# 2.A.31, also named bicarbonate transporter family) is a member of the large APC superfamily of secondary carriers. Members of the AE family are generally responsible for the transport of anions across cellular barriers, although their functions may vary. All of them exchange bicarbonate. Characterized protein members of the AE family are found in plants, animals, insects and yeast. Uncharacterized AE homologues may be present in bacteria (e.g., in Enterococcus faecium, 372 aas; gi 22992757; 29% identity in 90 residues). Animal AE proteins consist of homodimeric complexes of integral membrane proteins that vary in size from about 900 amino acyl residues to about 1250 residues. Their N-terminal hydrophilic domains may interact with cytoskeletal proteins and therefore play a cell structural role. Some of the currently characterized members of the AE family can be found in the Transporter Classification Database.

== Family overview ==
Bicarbonate transporter, C-terminal domain
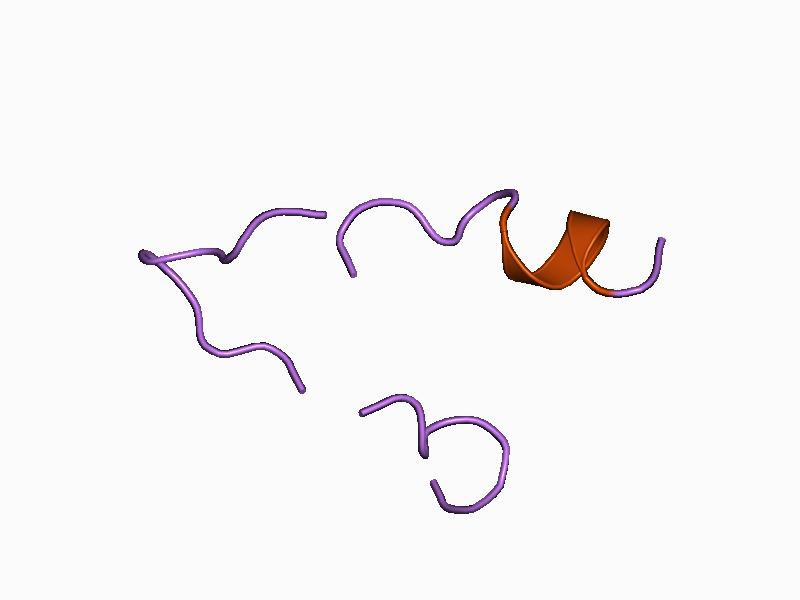
- a low energy structure for the final cytoplasmic loop of band 3, nmr, minimized average structure

Identifiers
- Symbol: HCO3_transpt_C
- Pfam: PF00955
- Pfam clan: CL0062
- InterPro: IPR011531
- PROSITE: PDOC00192
- SCOP2: 1btr / SCOPe / SUPFAM
Available protein structures:
- PDB: IPR011531 PF00955 (ECOD; PDBsum)
- AlphaFold: IPR011531; PF00955

Band 3 cytoplasmic domain
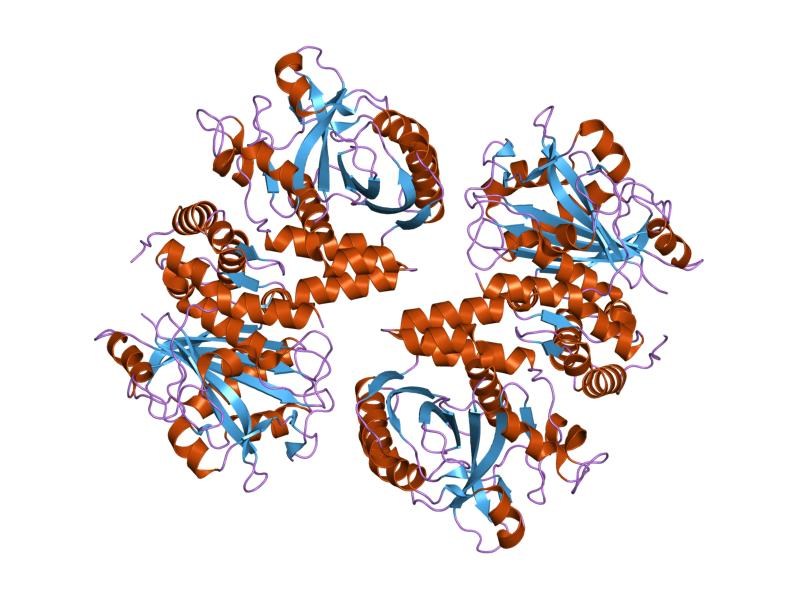
- crystal structure of the cytoplasmic domain of human erythrocyte band-3 protein

Identifiers
- Symbol: Band_3_cyto
- Pfam: PF07565
- Pfam clan: CL0340
- InterPro: IPR013769
- SCOP2: 1hyn / SCOPe / SUPFAM
- TCDB: 2.A.31
- OPM superfamily: 284
- OPM protein: 1btq
Available protein structures:
- PDB: IPR013769 PF07565 (ECOD; PDBsum)
- AlphaFold: IPR013769; PF07565

Bicarbonate (HCO_{3}^{–}) transport mechanisms are the principal regulators of pH in animal cells. Such transport also plays a vital role in acid-base movements in the stomach, pancreas, intestine, kidney, reproductive organs and the central nervous system. Functional studies have suggested different HCO_{3}^{–} transport modes.

- Anion exchanger proteins exchange HCO_{3}^{–} for Cl^{−} in a reversible, electroneutral manner.
- Na^{+}/HCO_{3}^{–} cotransport proteins mediate the coupled movement of Na^{+} and HCO_{3}^{–} across plasma membranes, often in an electrogenic manner.

Sequence analysis of the two families of HCO_{3}^{–} transporters that have been cloned to date (the anion exchangers and Na^{+}/HCO_{3}^{–} cotransporters) reveals that they are homologous. This is not entirely unexpected, given that they both transport HCO_{3}^{–} and are inhibited by a class of pharmacological agents called disulphonic stilbenes. They share around ~25-30% sequence identity, which is distributed along their entire sequence length, and have similar predicted membrane topologies, suggesting they have around 10 transmembrane (TM) domains.

A conserved domain is found at the C terminus of many bicarbonate transport proteins. It is also found in some plant proteins responsible for boron transport. In these proteins it covers almost the entire length of the sequence.

The Band 3 anion exchange proteins that exchange bicarbonate are the most abundant polypeptide in the red blood cell membrane, comprising 25% of the total membrane protein. The cytoplasmic domain of band 3 functions primarily as an anchoring site for other membrane-associated proteins. Included among the protein ligands of this domain are ankyrin, protein 4.2, protein 4.1, glyceraldehyde-3-phosphate dehydrogenase (GAPDH), phosphofructokinase, aldolase, hemoglobin, hemichromes, and the protein tyrosine kinase (p72syk).

== Anion exchangers in humans ==
In humans, anion exchangers fall under the solute carrier family 4 (SLC4) family, which is composed of 10 paralogous members (SLC4A1-5; SLC4A7-11). Nine encode proteins that transport HCO_{3}^{–}. Functionally, eight of these proteins fall into two major groups: three Cl^{−}:HCO_{3}^{–} exchangers (AE1-3) and five Na^{+}-coupled HCO_{3}^{–} transporters (NBCe1, NBCe2, NBCn1, NBCn2, NDCBE). Two of the Na^{+}-coupled transporters (NBCe1, NBCe2) are electrogenic; the other three Na^{+}-coupled HCO_{3}^{–} transporters and all three AEs are electroneutral. Two others (AE4, SLC4A9 and BTR1, SLC4A11) are not characterized. Most, though not all, are inhibited by 4,4′-diisothiocyanatostilbene-2,2′-disulfonate (DIDS). SLC4 proteins play roles in acid-base homeostasis, transport of H^{+} or HCO_{3}^{–} by epithelia (e.g. absorption of HCO_{3}^{–} in the renal proximal tubule, secretion of HCO_{3}^{–} in the pancreatic duct), as well as the regulation of cell volume and intracellular pH.

Based on their hydropathy plots all SLC4 proteins are hypothesized to share a similar topology in the cell membrane. They have relatively long cytoplasmic N-terminal domains composed of a few hundred to several hundred residues, followed by 10-14 transmembrane (TM) domains, and end with relatively short cytoplasmic C-terminal domains composed of ~30 to ~90 residues. Although the C-terminal domain comprises a small percentage of the size of the protein, this domain in some cases, has (i) binding motifs that may be important for protein-protein interactions (e.g., AE1, AE2, and NBCn1), (ii) is important for trafficking to the cell membrane (e.g., AE1 and NBCe1), and (iii) may provide sites for regulation of transporter function via protein kinase A phosphorylation (e.g., NBCe1).

The SLC4 family comprises the following proteins.

- SLC4A1
- SLC4A2
- SLC4A3
- SLC4A4
- SLC4A5
- SLC4A7
- SLC4A8
- SLC4A9
- SLC4A10
- SLC4A11

=== Anion exchanger 1 ===
The human anion exchanger 1 (AE1 or Band 3) binds carbonic anhydrase II (CAII) forming a "transport metabolon" as CAII binding activates AE1 transport activity about 10 fold. AE1 is also activated by interaction with glycophorin, which also functions to target it to the plasma membrane. The membrane-embedded C-terminal domains may each span the membrane 13-16 times. According to the model of Zhu et al. (2003), AE1 in humans spans the membrane 16 times, 13 times as α-helix, and three times (TMSs 10, 11 and 14) possibly as β-strands. AE1 preferentially catalyzes anion exchange (antiport) reactions. Specific point mutations in human anion exchanger 1 (AE1) convert this electroneutral anion exchanger into a monovalent cation conductance. The same transport site within the AE1 spanning domain is involved in both anion exchange and cation transport.

AE1 in human red blood cells has been shown to transport a variety of inorganic and organic anions. Divalent anions may be symported with H^{+}. Additionally, it catalyzes flipping of several anionic amphipathic molecules such as sodium dodecyl sulfate (SDS) and phosphatidic acid from one monolayer of the phospholipid bilayer to the other monolayer. The rate of flipping is sufficiently rapid to suggest that this AE1-catalyzed process is physiologically important in red blood cells and possibly in other animal tissues as well. Anionic phospholipids and fatty acids are likely to be natural substrates. However, the mere presence of TMSs enhances the rates of lipid flip-flop.

==== Structure ====
The crystal structure of AE1 (CTD) at 3.5 Å has been determined. The structure is locked in an outward-facing open conformation by an inhibitor. Comparing this structure with a substrate-bound structure of the uracil transporter UraA in an inward-facing conformation allowed identification of the likely anion-binding position in the AE1 (CTD), and led to proposal of a possible transport mechanism that could explain why selected mutations lead to disease. The 3D structure confirmed that the AE family is a member of the APC superfamily.

There are several crystal structures available for the AE1 protein in RCSB (links are also available in TCDB).

AE1: 1BH7, 1BNX, 1BTQ, 1BTR, 1BTS, 1BTT, 1BZK, 2BTA, 1HYN, 2BTB, 3BTB, 2BTA, 2BTB, 3BTB, 4KY9, PDB: 4YZF, 1HYN, 5A16

=== Other members ===
Renal Na^{+}:HCO_{3}^{–} cotransporters have been found to be members of the AE family. They catalyze the reabsorption of HCO_{3}^{–} in the renal proximal tubule in an electrogenic process that is inhibited by typical stilbene inhibitors of AE such as DIDS and SITS. They are also found in many other body tissues. At least two genes encode these symporters in any one mammal. A 10 TMS model has been presented, but this model conflicts with the 14 TMS model proposed for AE1. The transmembrane topology of the human pancreatic electrogenic Na^{+}:HCO_{3}^{–} transporter, NBC1, has been studied. A TMS topology with N- and C-termini in the cytoplasm has been suggested. An extracellular loop determines the stoichiometry of Na^{+}:HCO_{3}^{–} cotransporters.

In addition to the Na^{+}-independent anion exchangers (AE1-3) and the Na^{+}:HCO_{3}^{–} cotransporters (NBCs) (which may be either electroneutral or electrogenic), a Na^{+}-driven HCO_{3}^{–}:Cl^{−} exchanger (NCBE) has been sequenced and characterized. It transports Na^{+} + HCO_{3}^{–} preferentially in the inward direction and H^{+} + Cl^{−} in the outward direction. This NCBE is widespread in mammalian tissues where it plays an important role in cytoplasmic alkalinization. For example, in pancreatic β-cells, it mediates a glucose-dependent rise in pH related to insulin secretion.

Animal cells in tissue culture expressing the gene-encoding the ABC-type chloride channel protein CFTR (TC# 3.A.1.202.1) in the plasma membrane have been reported to exhibit cyclic AMP-dependent stimulation of AE activity. Regulation was independent of the Cl^{−} conductance function of CFTR, and mutations in the nucleotide-binding domain #2 of CFTR altered regulation independently of their effects on chloride channel activity. These observations may explain impaired HCO_{3}^{–} secretion in cystic fibrosis patients.

== Anion exchangers in plants and fungi ==
Plants and yeast have anion transporters that in both the pericycle cells of plants and the plasma membrane of yeast cells export borate or boric acid (pK_{a} = 9.2). In A. thaliana, boron is exported from pericycle cells into the root stellar apoplasm against a concentration gradient for uptake into the shoots. In S. cerevisiae, export is also against a concentration gradient. The yeast transporter recognizes HCO_{3}^{–}, I^{−}, Br^{−}, NO_{3}^{–} and Cl^{−}, which may be substrates. Tolerance to boron toxicity in cereals is known to be associated with reduced tissue accumulation of boron. Expression of genes from roots of boron-tolerant wheat and barley with high similarity to efflux transporters from Arabidopsis and rice lowered boron concentrations due to an efflux mechanism. The mechanism of energy coupling is not known, nor is it known if borate or boric acid is the substrate. Several possibilities (uniport, anion:anion exchange and anion:cation exchange) can account for the data.

== Transport reactions ==
The physiologically relevant transport reaction catalyzed by anion exchangers of the AE family is:

Cl^{−}(in) + HCO_{3}^{–}(out) ⇌ Cl^{−} (out) + HCO_{3}^{–}(in).

That for the Na^{+}:HCO_{3}^{–} cotransporters is:

Na^{+}(out) + n HCO_{3}^{–}(out) → Na^{+}(in) + n HCO_{3}^{–}(in).

That for the Na^{+}/HCO_{3}^{–}:H^{+}/Cl^{−} exchanger is:

Na^{+}(out) + HCO_{3}^{–}(out) + H^{+}(in) + Cl^{−}(in) ⇌ Na^{+}(in) + HCO_{3}^{–}(in) + H^{+}(out) + Cl^{−}(out).

That for the boron efflux protein of plants and yeast is:

Boron (in) → Boron (out)

== See also ==
- Solute carrier family
- Transporter Classification Database
