= Uhthoff =

Uhthoff is a surname. Notable people with the surname include:

- Ina D. D. Uhthoff (1889–1971), Scottish-Canadian painter
- Wilhelm Uhthoff (1853–1927), German ophthalmologist

== See also ==
- Uhthoff's phenomenon, is the worsening of neurologic symptoms in multiple sclerosis (MS) and other neurological, demyelinating conditions
