= Scd =

Scd or SCD may refer to:

== In medicine ==
- Salicylate decarboxylase, an enzyme
- Schnyder crystalline corneal dystrophy, an eye disease
- Scrupulous–compulsive disorder, a mental disorder
- Sequential compression device, to improve blood flow
- Sickle-cell disease, a blood disease
- Specific carbohydrate diet
- Stearoyl-CoA desaturase-1, an enzyme
- Sudden cardiac death
- Superior canal dehiscence, of the inner ear

== In engineering and information technology ==
- System context diagram
- /dev/scd, SCSI audio-oriented optical disk drives
- Slowly changing dimension, a datawarehousing term for data that changes slowly
- The Scientific Computing Division of the National Center for Atmospheric Research
- Substation Configuration Description for electrical substations
- Special category data, sensitive data as defined by the GDPR

== Other uses ==
- Satélite de Coleta de Dados, Brazilian satellites SCD-1 and SCD-2
- Sc.D., Doctor of Science degree
- Scottish country dance
- Senior College Dún Laoghaire, now Blackrock Further Education Institute, Ireland
- Service-Connected Discharge a category of discharge from the United States Army
- Social communication disorder, a language disorder
- Sonic CD
- Specialist Crime Directorate (Metropolitan Police), London, former branch
- Sports Collectors Digest, a publication
- St. Cloud station, Minnesota, U.S., Amtrak code
- Strictly Come Dancing, a British TV show
- Sylacauga Municipal Airport, Alabama, US, FAA identifier
- Syrian Civil Defense or the White Helmets, a volunteer organisation
