= Meesmann corneal dystrophy =

Meesmann Corneal Dystrophy
- Other names: Meesmann Epithelial Corneal Dystrophy Meesmann-Wilke Syndrome
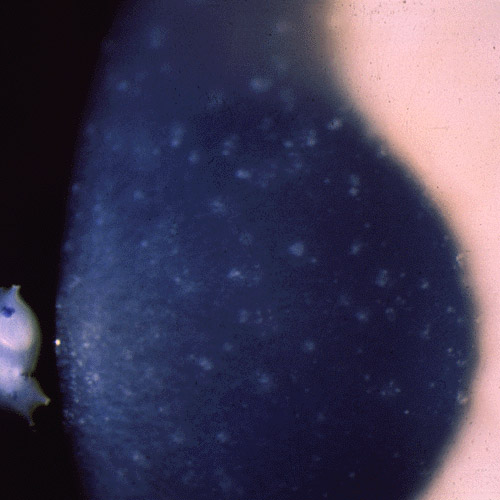
- Multiple opaque spots in the corneal epithelium
- Specialty: Ophthalmology
- Symptoms: Anterior corneal intraepithelial microcysts, Corneal erosions, Photophobia, Lacrimation, Intermittent visual, acuity loss (rarely seriously impaired), Nonprogressive corneal dystrophy, Fine punctate corneal opacities, Episodic foreign body sensation, Increased tear production, eye stinging, Blepharospasm
- Usual onset: Infancy or Young Childhood
- Duration: Lifelong
- Types: Meesmann corneal dystrophy 1, Meesmann corneal dystrophy 2
- Diagnostic method: Slit Lamp Biomicroscopy
- Treatment: Eye drops, Corneal Surgery
- Frequency: 0.0001%

Meesmann corneal dystrophy (MECD) is a rare hereditary autosomal dominant disease that is characterized as a type of corneal dystrophy and a keratin disease. MECD is characterized by the formation of microcysts in the outermost layer of the cornea, known as the anterior corneal epithelium. The anterior corneal epithelium also becomes fragile. This usually affects both eyes rather than a single eye and worsens over time. There are two phenotypes, Meesmann corneal dystrophy 1 (MECD1) and Meesmann corneal dystrophy 2 (MECD2), which affect the genes KRT3 and KRT12, respectively. A heterozygous mutation in either of these genes will lead to a single phenotype. Many with Meesmann corneal dystrophy are asymptomatic or experience mild symptoms.

Autosomal Dominant Inheritance Pattern

It is named after the German ophthalmologist Alois Meesmann (1888–1969). It is often considered as the "Meesmann-Wilke syndrome", after the joint contribution of Meesmann and Wilke in 1939. Research was later contributed by Stocker and Holt in 1954 through 1955 who found a variant of Meesmann corneal dystrophy called "Stocker-Holt Dystrophy".

== Symptoms and signs ==
- Anterior corneal intraepithelial microcysts
- Corneal erosions
- Photophobia
- Lacrimation
- Intermittent visual acuity loss (rarely seriously impaired)
- Nonprogressive corneal dystrophy
- Fine punctate corneal opacities
- Episodic foreign body sensation
- Increased tear production
- Eye stinging
- Blepharospasm

Meesmann corneal dystrophy is a non-inflammatory condition that effects the restricted region of the cornea epithelium which is the outermost layer. Onset of symptoms begin during infancy or early childhood but may not become noticeable or problematic for many years.

== Genetics ==
It has been associated with genes KRT3 and KRT12 located on chromosome 12 and 17 respectively found through the use of Polymerase chain reaction or PCR. These two genes function for keratin production and code for the production of keratin K3 (type II) and K12 (type I). There are several methods to find errors or mutations in the KRT3 and KRT12 genes including deletion/duplication analysis, sequence analysis of the entire coding region, and targeted variant analysis. These methods includes molecular genetic tests which include Next-Generation (NGS)/Massively parallel sequencing (MPS) and bi-directional sanger sequence analysis.

A heterozygous missense mutation of Leu132Pro in the KRT12 gene exhibits a more severe phenotype while a mutation of Arg135Thr, which is most commonly found, exhibits milder symptoms. The Leu132Pro mutation and the animo acid change of N133K occurs in the helix-initiation motif of the keratin and was found to cause significant structural changes to the KRT12 gene. This mutation also leads to the aggregation of keratine and alters the keratin configuration of the corneal epithelium. The mechanism by which this mutation in K12 causes the formation of microcysts remains poorly understood.

== Diagnosis ==
Patients with Meesmann corneal dystrophy may remain asymptomatic or experience mild symptoms. Symptoms of Meesmann corneal dystrophy often go unnoticed and is usually found and diagnosed during routine eye examinations. This slowly progressive disorder is characterized by microcysts that are filled with debris in the epithelium of the cornea detected and clinically diagnosed with slit-lamp biomicroscopy and retroillumination. Under electron microscopy, there are an abnormal aggregation of keratin filament bundles in the center of the cornea. It was found to not affect the corneal stromal layer or endothelial cell layer. Signs of this disease appear in the early first few years of life and begin as eye irritation. Under magnification, corneal changes consisting of punctate opacities in the epithelium are found. Occasionally, these are found in the Bowman membrane. Patients diagnosed with Meesmann corneal dystrophy are unable to tolerate the use of contact lenses which irritate the corneal epithelium. Light microscopy and electron microscopy found that the basement membrane is thickened with an intracytoplasmic substance. Under slit-lamp photography, the cornea was found to be uneven due to the damage and scarring from the thickening basement membrane and anterior stroma. The buildup of foreign materials may cause vision blurriness or cloudiness.

== Treatment ==
Patients with Meesman corneal dystrophy will develop chronic eye dryness that can be treated with lubricating eye drops but most cases do not require further treatment. In severe cases, surgery may be required due to excessive corneal scarring such as superficial keratectomy (SK), phototherapeutic keratectomy (PTK), lamellar keratoplasty, or penetrating keratoplasty. Patients may relapse in symptoms but surgery prolongs the reoccurrence and may also lessen severity. Currently there are researchers studying the use of allele-specific siRNA against mutants with single-nucleotide specificity as a potential method of treatment for MECD.

== See also ==
- Corneal dystrophy
- List of cutaneous conditions caused by mutations in keratins
- Epithelial basement membrane dystrophy
- Reis-Bucklers corneal dystrophy
- Thiel-Behnke corneal dystrophy
- Cataract
