= Thiel–Behnke dystrophy =

- Other names: Corneal dystrophy of Bowman layer, type II
- Specialty: Ophthalmology

Thiel–Behnke dystrophy is a rare form of corneal dystrophy affecting the layer that supports corneal epithelium. The dystrophy was first described in 1967 and initially suspected to denote the same entity as the earlier-described Reis-Bucklers dystrophy, but following a study in 1995 by Kuchle et al. the two look-alike dystrophies were deemed separate disorders.

== Presentation ==
To clarify whether Thiel–Behnke corneal dystrophy is a separate entity from Reis-Bucklers corneal dystrophy, Kuchle et al. (1995) examined 28 corneal specimens with a clinically suspected diagnosis of corneal dystrophy of the Bowman layer by light and electron microscopy and reviewed the literature and concluded that two distinct autosomal dominant corneal dystrophy of Bowman layer (CBD) exist and proposed the designation CDB type I (geographic or 'true' Reis-Bucklers dystrophy) and CDB type II (honeycomb-shaped or Thiel–Behnke dystrophy). Visual loss is significantly greater in CDB I, and recurrences after corneal transplantation seem to be earlier and more extensive in CDB I.

== Genetics ==
Some cases of it are linked to chromosome 10q24, others stem from a mutation in the TGFBI gene.

== See also ==
- Corneal dystrophy
