= CSCD =

CSCD may refer to:

- Cascade and Columbia River Railroad
- Chinese Science Citation Database
- Congenital stromal corneal dystrophy
