= Arthur Groenouw =

German ophthalmologist (1862–1945)

Arthur Groenouw (27 March 1862 – 1945) was a German ophthalmologist born in Bosatz, a village near Ratibor.

He studied medicine in Breslau, and was an assistant to physiologist Rudolf Heidenhain (1834–1897) and ophthalmologist Wilhelm Uhthoff (1853–1927). In 1892 he was habilitated for ophthalmology in Breslau, and in 1899 attained the title of professor.

In 1890 Groenouw described two different types of corneal dystrophy, of which he wrote about in an article titled "Knötchenförmige Hornhauttrübungen" (noduli corneae). At the time, he believed that the two types were variations of the same disease. Later on, his findings on corneal dystrophy were classified as two separate syndromes:

- "Groenouw Type I": Granular type of corneal dystrophy. Characterized by discrete grey opacities scattered over the surface of the cornea.
- "Groenouw Type II": Macular type of corneal dystrophy. Characterized by greyish white opaque granules with sharp borders, mostly in central part of cornea.
