= MK4 =

MK4 may refer to:

- Mortal Kombat 4, the fourth game in the Mortal Kombat series
- Menatetrenone, vitamin K_{2}
- Mario Kart: Double Dash, the fourth game in the Mario Kart series, released in 2003 for the Nintendo GameCube
