= Uthoff =

Uthoff is a surname. Notable people with the surname include:

- Dean Uthoff (born 1958), American-Australian basketball player
- Ernst Uthoff Biefang (1904–1993), German-born Chilean ballet dancer, choreographer, and director
- Jarrod Uthoff (born 1993), American basketball player
- Reiner Uthoff (1937–2024), German writer

== See also ==
- Uhthoff
