= CK3 =

Ck3 or CK3 may refer to:

- Crusader Kings III, a grand strategy computer game developed by Paradox Interactive
- Keratin 3, also known as cytokeratin-3
