= FCDS =

FCDS may refer to:

- Fairfield Country Day School, in Connecticut, United States
- Forsyth Country Day School, in North Carolina, United States
- Family Computer Disk System, an add-on for Nintendo's Family Computer game console

== See also ==
- FCD (disambiguation)
