= Granular corneal dystrophy =

Formation of opaque spots on the transparent cornea of the eye

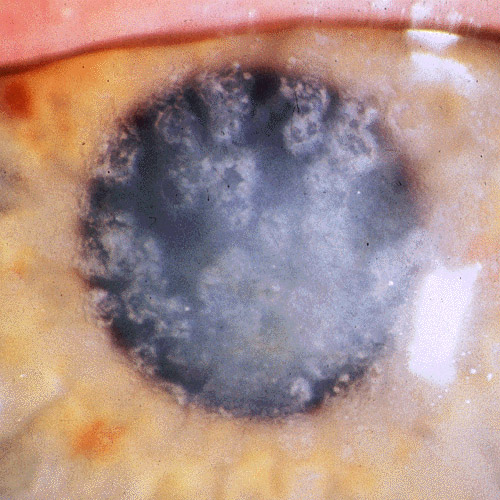
- Granular corneal dystrophy type I, Numerous irregular shaped discrete crumb-like corneal opacities
- Specialty: Ophthalmology

Granular corneal dystrophy is a slowly progressive corneal dystrophy that most often begins in early childhood.

Granular corneal dystrophy has two types:

- Granular corneal dystrophy type I, also corneal dystrophy Groenouw type I, is a rare form of human corneal dystrophy. It was first described by German ophthalmologist Arthur Groenouw in 1890.
- Granular corneal dystrophy type II, also called Avellino corneal dystrophy or combined granular-lattice corneal dystrophy is also a rare form of corneal dystrophy. The disorder was first described by Folberg et al. in 1988. The name Avellino corneal dystrophy comes from the first four patients in the original study each tracing their family origin to the Italian province of Avellino.

== Presentation ==
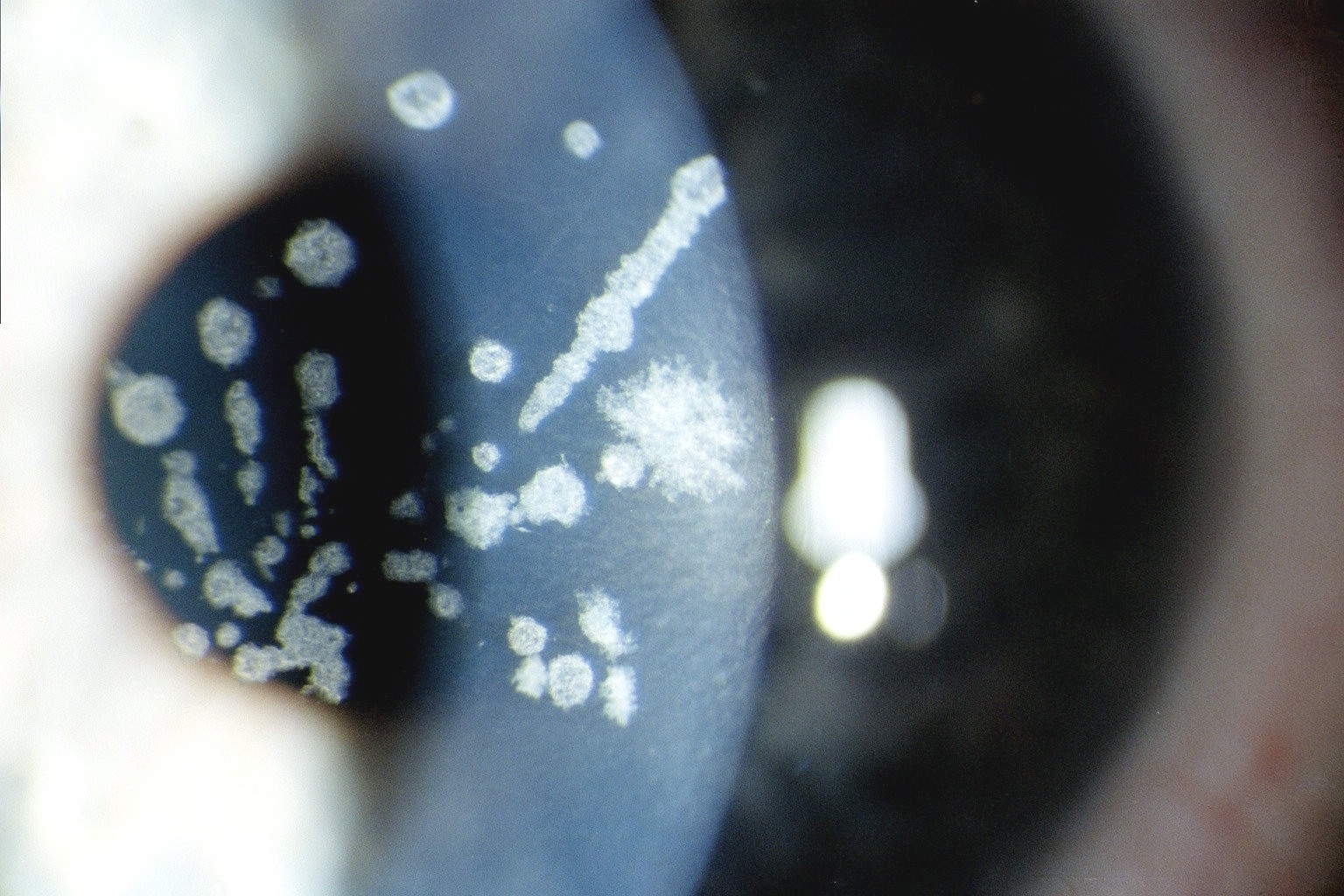
Granular corneal dystrophy type II, Variable sized crumb-like opacities in the corneal stroma that have become fused in areas giving rise to elongated and stellate shapes

Granular corneal dystrophy is diagnosed during an eye examination by an ophthalmologist or optometrist. The lesions consist of central, fine, whitish granular lesions in the cornea. Visual acuity is slightly reduced.

== Genetics ==
Granular corneal dystrophy is caused by a mutation in the TGFBI gene, located on chromosome 5q31. The disorder is inherited in an autosomal dominant manner. This indicates that the defective gene responsible for the disorder is located on an autosome (chromosome 5 is an autosome), and only one copy of the gene is sufficient to cause the disorder, when inherited from a parent who has the disorder.

The gene TGFBI encodes the protein keratoepithelin.

== Treatment ==
Corneal transplant is not needed except in very severe and late cases. Light sensitivity may be overcome by wearing tinted glasses.

== See also ==
- Corneal dystrophy
