= Subepithelial mucinous corneal dystrophy =

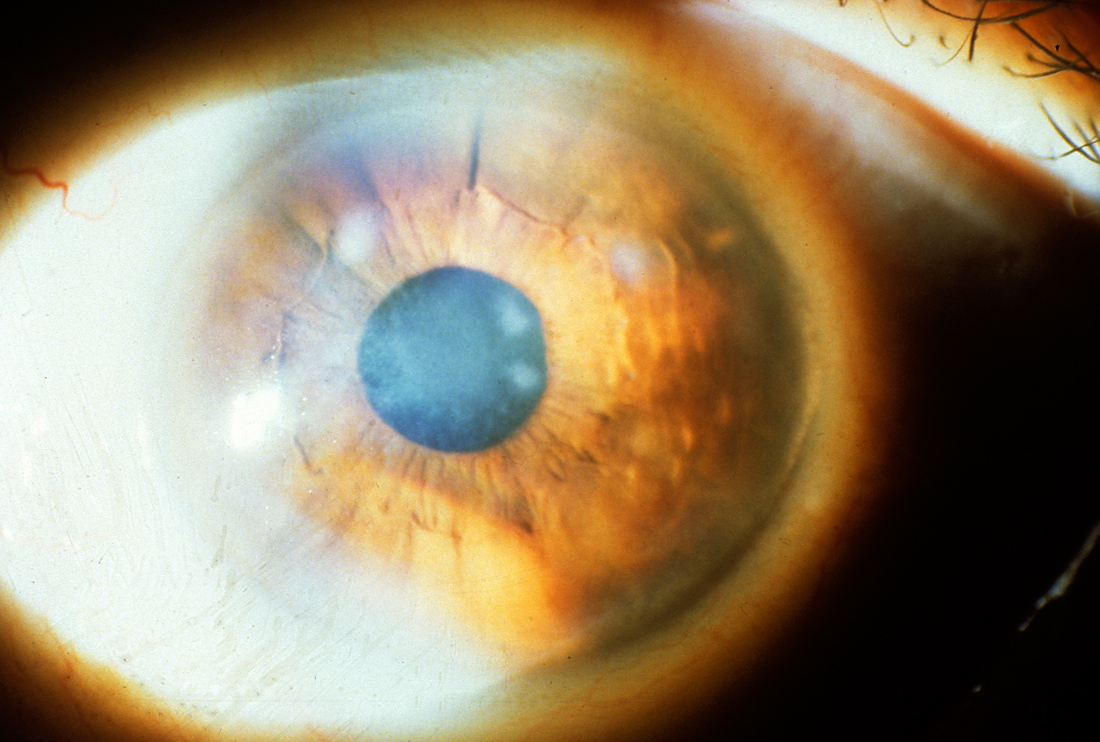
- A diffuse haziness is present in the papillary region of the cornea in association with discrete opacities. (Reproduced in Klintworth et al. with permission from Feder et al.)
- Specialty: Ophthalmology

Subepithelial mucinous corneal dystrophy (SMCD), a condition of the eye, is a rare form of corneal dystrophy. It was first described in 1993 by Feder et al. Anterior to Bowman layer, deposits of glycosaminoglycan were detected and identified as chondroitin-4-sulfate and dermatan sulfate.
