= Menadione =

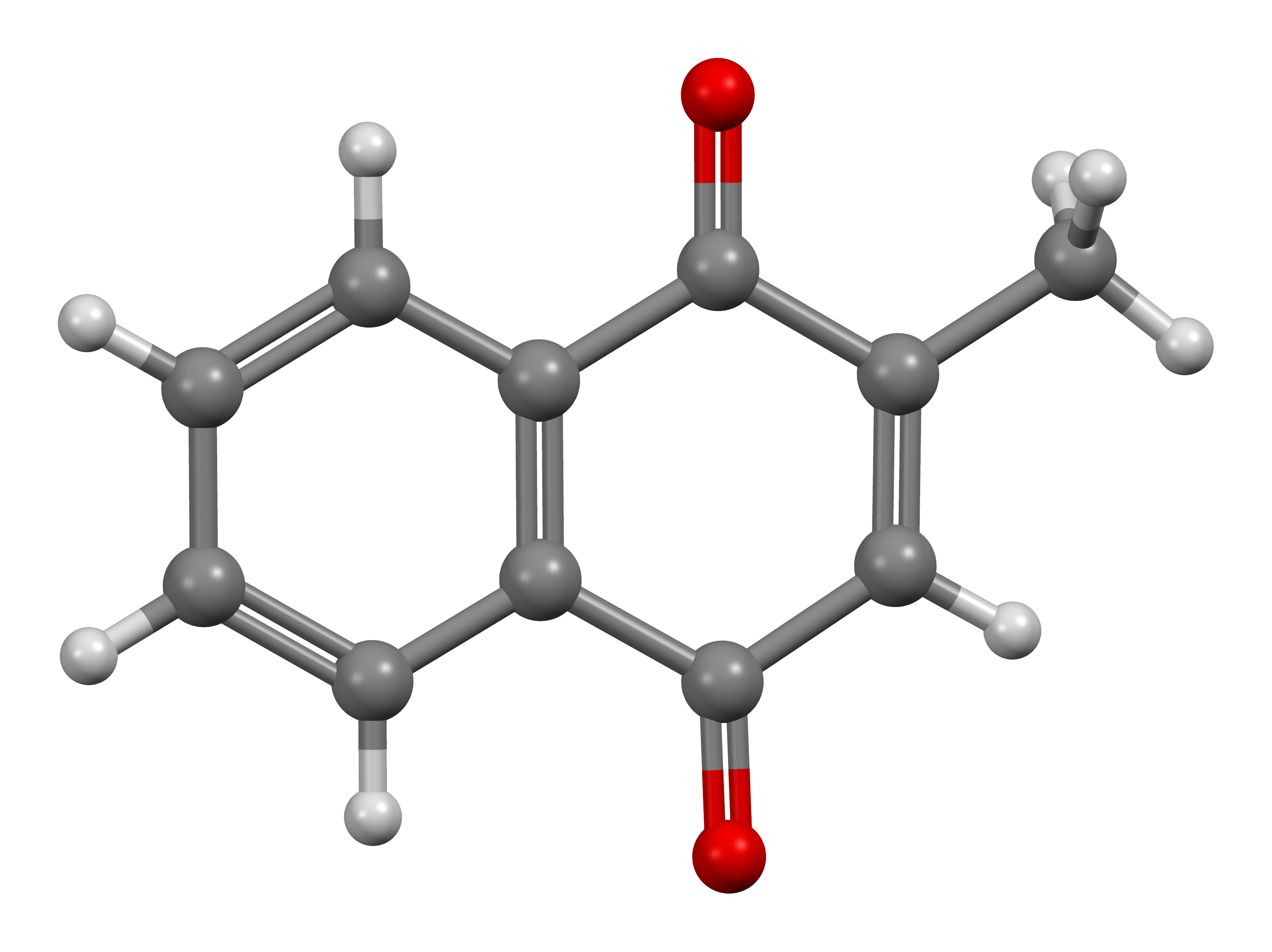

Clinical data
- Other names: Menaphthone; Vitamin K_{3}; β-Methyl-1,4-naphthoquinone; 2-Methyl-1,4-naphthodione; 2-Methyl-1,4-naphthoquinone
- ATC code: B02BA02 (WHO)

Identifiers
- IUPAC name: 2-Methylnaphthalene-1,4-dione (preferred)
- CAS Number: 58-27-5
- PubChem CID: 4055
- DrugBank: DB00170
- ChemSpider: 3915
- UNII: 723JX6CXY5
- KEGG: D02335
- ChEBI: CHEBI:28869
- CompTox Dashboard (EPA): DTXSID4021715
- ECHA InfoCard: 100.000.338

Chemical and physical data
- Formula: C_{11}H_{8}O_{2}
- Molar mass: 172.183 g·mol^{−1}
- 3D model (JSmol): Interactive image
- SMILES: CC1=CC(=O)C2=CC=CC=C2C1=O
- InChI: InChI=1S/C11H8O2/c1-7-6-10(12)8-4-2-3-5-9(8)11(7)13/h2-6H,1H3; Key:MJVAVZPDRWSRRC-UHFFFAOYSA-N

Menadione
Properties
Chemical formula	C_{11}H_{8}O_{2}
Molar mass	172.183 g·mol^{−1}
Appearance	Bright yellow crystals
Density	1.225g/cm3
Melting point	105 to 107 °C (221 to 225 °F; 378 to 380 K)
Solubility in water	Water: 160 mg/L (at 30 °C). Slightly soluble in ethanol, acetic acid, and ligroin. Soluble in ethyl ether, benzene, chloroform, and sulfuric acid.

Pharmacology
ATC code	B02BA02 (WHO)
Pregnancy category	Contraindicated (India)
Routes of administration	Oral; Intravenous; Intramuscular
Legal status	Generally Rx or withdrawn for human use; approved in animal feed

Hazards
Flash point	113.8 °C (236.8 °F; 386.9 K)
- Lethal dose or concentration (LD, LC)
LD_{50} (median dose)	0.5 g/kg (oral, mouse)
- Except where otherwise noted, data are given for materials in their standard state (at 25 °C [77 °F], 100 kPa). Infobox references

Menadione is a natural organic compound with the formula C_{6}H_{4}(CO)_{2}C_{2}H(CH_{3}). It is an analog of 1,4-naphthoquinone with a methyl group in the 2-position. It is sometimes called vitamin K_{3}. Use is allowed as a nutritional supplement in animal feed because of its vitamin K activity.

== Biochemistry ==
Menadione is converted to vitamin K_{2} (specifically, MK-4) by the prenyltransferase action of vertebrate protein UBIAD1. This reaction requires the hydroquinone (reduced) form of K_{3}, menadiol, produced by NQO1.

Menadione is also a circulating form of vitamin K, produced in small amounts (1–5%) after intestinal absorption of K_{1} and K_{2}. This circulation explains the uneven tissue distribution of MK-4, especially since menadione can penetrate the blood–brain barrier. The cleavage enzyme is yet to be identified. As K_{3} is known to be toxic in large amounts, researchers speculate that the cleavage process is closely regulated.

== Terminology ==
The compound is variously known as vitamin K_{3} and provitamin K_{3}. Proponents of the latter name generally argue that the compound is not a real vitamin due to its artificial status (prior to its identification as a circulating intermediate) and its lack of a 3-methyl side chain preventing it from exerting all the functions (specifically, it cannot act as a cofactor for GGCX in vitro) of the K vitamins.

=== Derivatives ===
The following are more water-soluble derivatives of menadione. They are also included in the term "vitamin K_{3}":

- Menadione sodium bisulfite or "menadione sodium bisulfite complex" (IUPAC name sodium;2-methyl-1,4-dioxo-3H-naphthalene-2-sulfonate) is the sodium salt of the 2-sulfonate of menadione (menadione bisulfide).
- Menadione nicotinamide bisulfite is a salt of nicotinamide and the 2-sulfonate of menadione. It has dual niacin and vitamin K activity in animal feed.

== Uses ==
The menadione core is apparent in the structure of vitamin K.

It is an intermediate in the chemical synthesis of vitamin K by first reduction to the diol menadiol, which is susceptible to coupling to the phytol. It is a useful intermediate for organic synthesis in general, as it can be made and modified in a number of ways.

Menadione can be used to generate reactive oxygen species to perform flow cytometry analysis on. It can also be used in microbiological evaluation to, for example, detect fastidious microorganisms.

=== Animal feed ===
In the United States, menadione is used in various types of animal feed and is described as having a history of safe use for this purpose, being used in poultry feed prior to 1958.

Low-dose menadione is used as an inexpensive micronutrient for livestock in many countries. Forms of menadione are also included in some pet foods in developed countries as a source of vitamin K. These doses have yielded no reported cases of toxicity from menadione in livestock or pets. Although handling may be hazardous, the European Food Safety Authority found in 2013 that it is an effective source of vitamin K in animal nutrition that does not pose a risk to the environment.

=== Human use ===
Despite the fact that it can serve as a precursor to various types of vitamin K, menadione is generally not used as a nutritional supplement in economically developed countries. Menadione for human use at pharmaceutical strength is available in some countries with large lower-income populations, such as India and the Philippines. The typical daily dose is 10 mg oral or 2 mg parenteral. It is used in the treatment of hypoprothrombinemia outside of the United States.

== Toxicology ==
Menadione is not believed to be carcinogenic. K3 can cause generation of reactive oxygen species (ROS) by redox cycling and arylation of thiols using its reactive 3-position. ROS generation explains various toxic effects of excessive menadione, including DNA damage and cell death, or on a whole-animal level, cardiac and renal toxicity in rats.

== See also ==
- Plumbagin
