= Kappadione =

Chemical compound

Clinical data
- Routes of administration: Injection
- ATC code: none

Legal status
- Legal status: US: Rx only, discontinued (was FDA approved); In general: ℞ (Prescription only)

Identifiers
- IUPAC name: Tetrasodium (2-methyl-4-phosphonatooxynaphthalen-1-yl) phosphate
- CAS Number: 6700-42-1
- PubChem CID: 8555
- DrugBank: DB09332
- ChemSpider: 8237
- UNII: 2OVL75B30W
- KEGG: D04908
- CompTox Dashboard (EPA): DTXSID80156832
- ECHA InfoCard: 100.004.558

Chemical and physical data
- Formula: C_{11}H_{8}Na_{4}O_{8}P_{2}
- Molar mass: 422.084 g·mol^{−1}
- 3D model (JSmol): Interactive image
- SMILES: CC1=C(C2=CC=CC=C2C(=C1)OP(=O)([O-])[O-])OP(=O)([O-])[O-].[Na+].[Na+].[Na+].[Na+]
- InChI: InChI=1S/C11H12O8P2.4Na/c1-7-6-10(18-20(12,13)14)8-4-2-3-5-9(8)11(7)19-21(15,16)17;;;;/h2-6H,1H3,(H2,12,13,14)(H2,15,16,17);;;;/q;4*+1/p-4; Key:GZBACHSOZNEZOG-UHFFFAOYSA-J

Kappadione is a vitamin K derivative used for the treatment of side effects of vitamin K antagonists such as warfarin, prophylaxis and treatment of vitamin K deficiency bleeding, and hypoprothrombinemia due to various causes. It was manufactured by Eli Lilly and Company. Chemically, it is menadiol sodium diphosphate. It was approved by the US Food and Drug Administration prior to 1982 and marketed by Lilly. It has since been discontinued and is not available in North America.
