= Menadiol =

Skeletal formula of menadiol
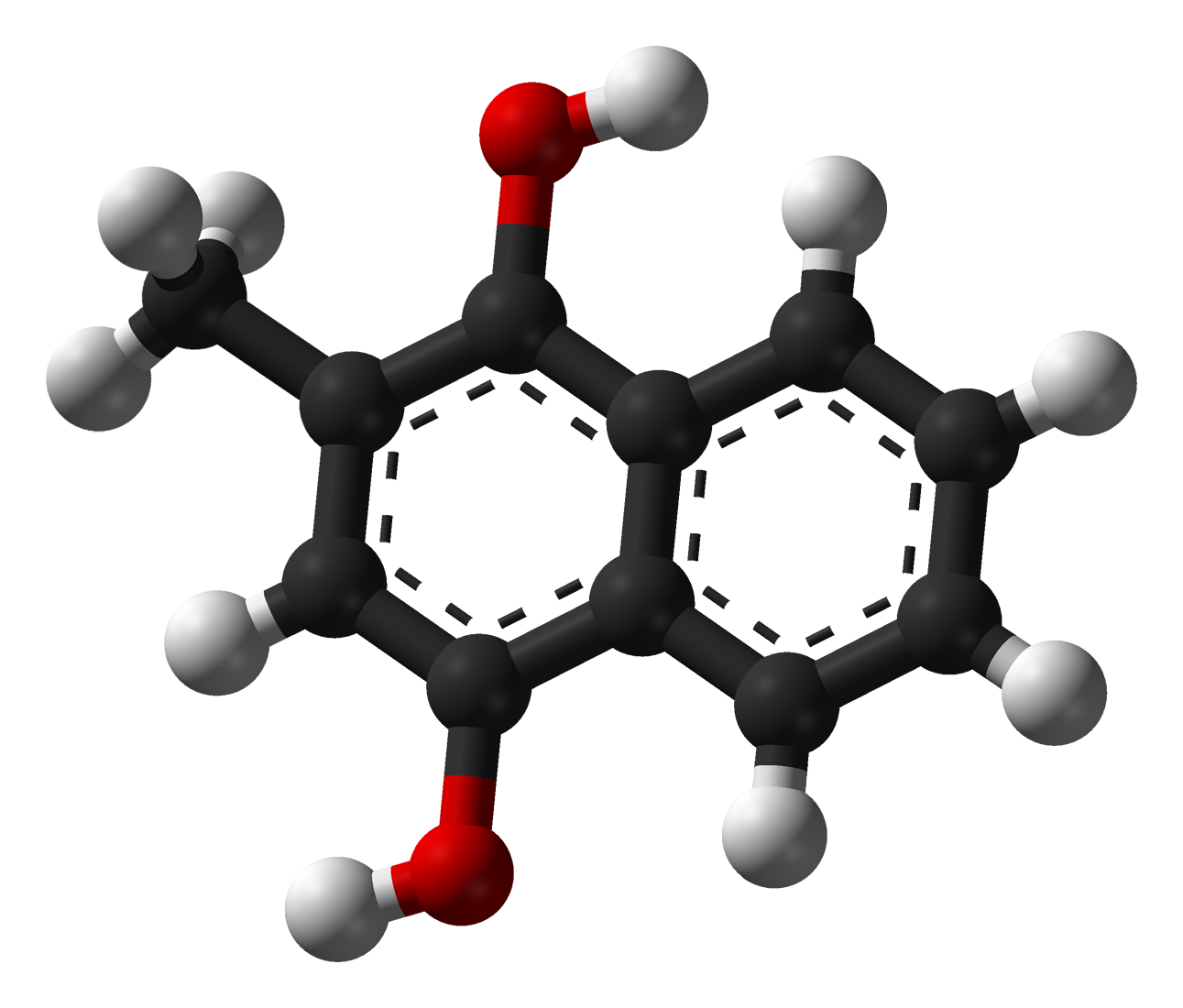
Ball-and-stick model of menadiol

Names
- Preferred IUPAC name 2-Methylnaphthalene-1,4-diol
- Other names 2-Methyl-1,4-naphthalenediol; 2-Methyl-1,4-dihydroxynaphthalene

Identifiers
CAS Number	481-85-6
3D model (JSmol)	Interactive image
ChemSpider	9794
ECHA InfoCard	100.006.886
PubChem CID	10209
UNII	VQ093653DO
CompTox Dashboard (EPA)	DTXSID5023247
- InChI: InChI=1S/C11H10O2/c1-7-6-10(12)8-4-2-3-5-9(8)11(7)13/h2-6,12-13H,1H3
- SMILES: Oc2c1ccccc1c(O)c(c2)C

Properties
Chemical formula	C_{11}H_{10}O_{2}
Molar mass	174.199 g·mol^{−1}
- Except where otherwise noted, data are given for materials in their standard state (at 25 °C [77 °F], 100 kPa). Infobox references

Menadiol is an organic compound with the formula C_{6}H_{4}(COH)_{2}(CH)(CH_{3}). It is formally the p-hydroquinone derivative of 2-methylnaphthalene. The name vitamin K_{4} can refer to:

- specifically this compound,
- its various esters, e.g.
  - menadiol diacetate (acetomenaphthone),
  - menadiol dibutyrate,
  - menadiol dimalonate, or
- its various salts, like
  - menadiol sodium diphosphate (Kappadione)
  - menadiol sodium disulfate.

Menadiol sodium diphosphate is approved in the UK for treatment and prevention of haemorrhage, mainly in obstructive jaundice (before and after surgery). Unlike natural, lipophilic forms of vitamin K, menadiol sodium diphosphate does not require bile for absorption, hence the use in obstructive jaundice. A disadvantage is that it takes 24 hours to show effects, though the effects do last for several days. It can cause hemolytic anemia, more commonly in people with glucose 6-phosphate dehydrogenase deficiency or vitamin E deficiency.

Menadiol is probably naturally produced by reduction of menadione ("vitamin K_{3}"; see Quinone § Reduction) as an intermediate in the conversion from K_{3} to MK-4. It can be oxidized in experimental conditions back to menadione.

The menadiol core is apparent in the structure of vitamin K1.

Menadiol diacetate

Menadiol dibutyrate
