= FCD =

FCD may refer to:

== Health and medicine ==
- Fibrocystic disease
- Fleck corneal dystrophy
- Focal cortical dysplasia
- Food composition data
- Fuchs' corneal dystrophy

== Other uses ==
- Family Computer Disk System, an add-on for Nintendo's Family Computer game console
- FC Dallas, an American soccer team
- Fire Calorimetry Database, contains results of fire experiments conducted at the National Institute of Standards and Technology (NIST)
- First Chief Directorate, a KGB intelligence organ
- Floating car data, also known as floating cellular data
- Forum for Democratic Change, a political party in Uganda
- Foundation for Child Development
- Free City of Danzig, a semi-autonomous city-state that existed between 1920 and 1939
