= Lisch epithelial corneal dystrophy =

- Other names: Band-shaped and whorled microcystic dystrophy of the corneal epithelium
- X-linked recessive is the inheritance pattern of this condition
- Specialty: Ophthalmology

Lisch epithelial corneal dystrophy (LECD), also known as band-shaped and whorled microcystic dystrophy of the corneal epithelium, is a rare form of corneal dystrophy first described in 1992 by Lisch et al. In one study it was linked to chromosomal region Xp22.3, with as yet unknown candidate genes.

The main features of this disease are bilateral or unilateral gray band-shaped and feathery opacities. They sometimes take on a form of a whirlpool, repeating the known pattern of corneal epithelium renewal. Abrasion of the epithelium in 3 patients brought only temporary relief, with abnormal epithelium regrowth in several months.

Epithelial cells in the zones of opacity were shown to have diffuse cytoplasmic vacuoles with as yet unestablished content.
