= Fleck corneal dystrophy =

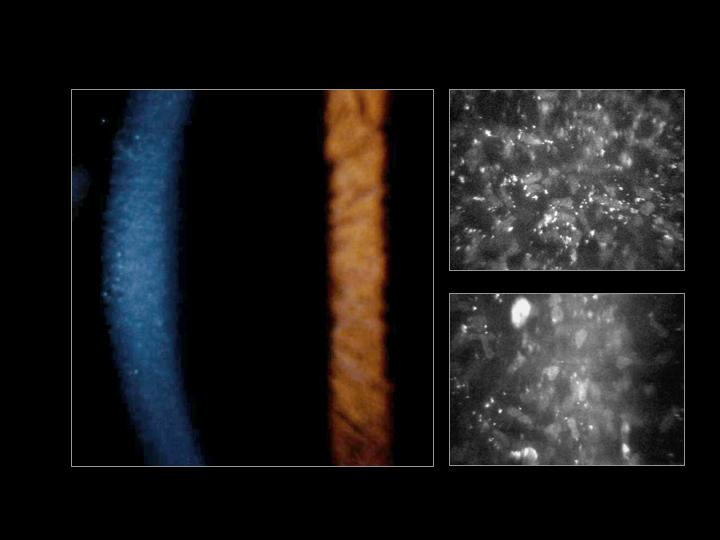
- Appearance of the cornea by slit-lamp biomicroscopy (left image) and by confocal microscopy (right image) (Courtesy Dr. Charles N. McGhee)
- Specialty: Ophthalmology

Fleck corneal dystrophy, also known as Francois-Neetens speckled corneal dystrophy, is a rare form of corneal dystrophy. It is caused by mutations in PIKFYVE gene. Small opacities, some of which resemble "flecks", are scattered in the stroma of the patients. Other opacities look more like snowflakes or clouds. The disease is non-progressive and in most cases asymptomatic, with mild photophobia reported by some patients. In a single case report, a corneal transplantation was performed for concurrent keratoconus, and at 10 years follow-up there was still no evidence of the inclusions in the stroma.
