= Congenital stromal corneal dystrophy =

- Other names: Witschel dystrophy
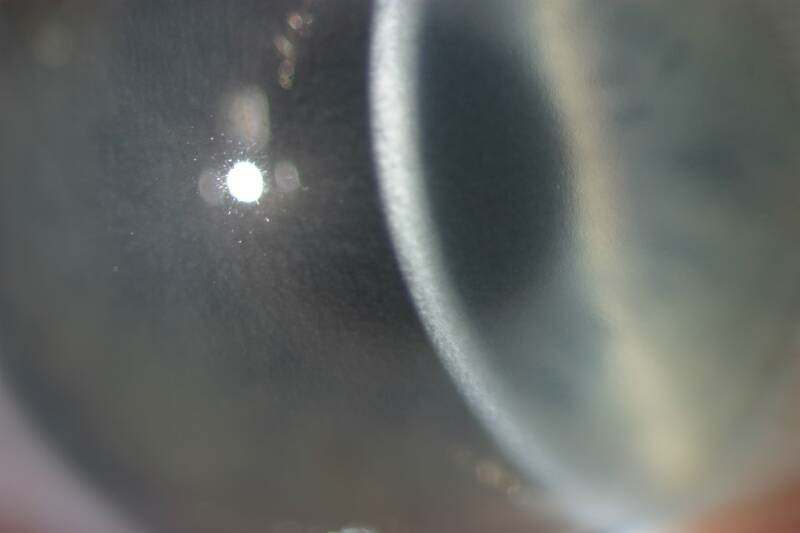
- The cornea is particularly opaque in the anterior stroma by slit-lamp biomicroscopy.

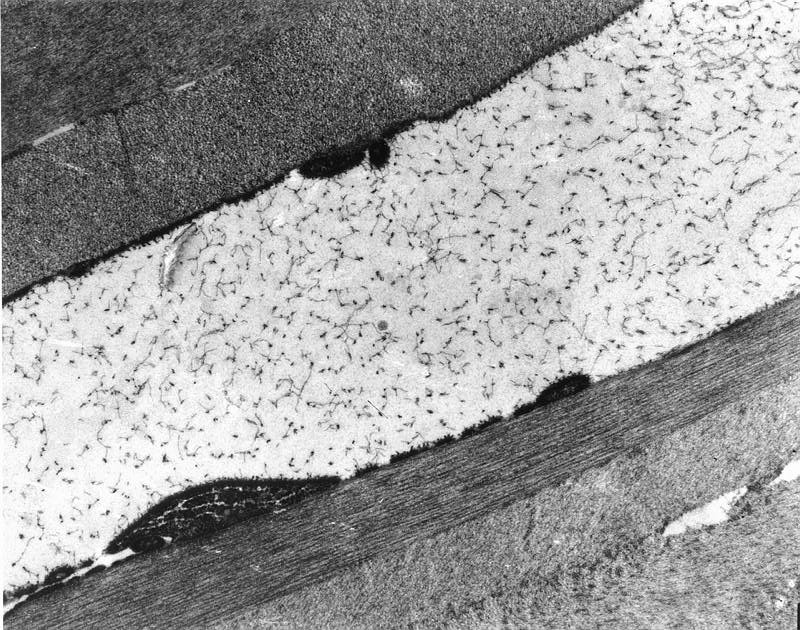
Congenital stromal dystrophy. Transmission electron microscopy of the corneal stroma showing normal collagen lamellae separated by abnormal randomly distributed collagen filaments in an electron-lucent extracellular matrix.

Congenital stromal corneal dystrophy (CSCD) is an extremely rare, autosomal dominant form of corneal dystrophy. Only 4 families have been reported to have the disease by 2009. The main features of the disease are numerous opaque flaky or feathery areas of clouding in the stroma that multiply with age and eventually preclude visibility of the endothelium. Strabismus or primary open angle glaucoma was noted in some of the patients. Thickness of the cornea stays the same, Descemet's membrane and endothelium are relatively unaffected, but the fibrils of collagen that constitute stromal lamellae are reduced in diameter and lamellae themselves are packed significantly more tightly.

== Genetics ==
CSCD is associated with a mutation in the gene DCN that encodes the protein decorin, located at chromosome 12q22. The disorder is inherited in an autosomal dominant manner, which indicates that the defective gene responsible for a disorder is located on an autosome (chromosome 12 is an autosome), and only one copy of the gene is sufficient to cause the disorder, when inherited from a parent who has the disorder.
