= Ina D. D. Uhthoff =

- Born: Ina Campbell; 1889; Kirn, Argyll, Scotland
- Died: 1971 (aged 81–82); Carleton Place, Ontario, Canada
- Known for: Painter
- Spouse: Edward Joseph Uhthoff (m. 1919)

Ina D .D. Uhthoff (née Campbell) (1889 – 1971) was a Scots-Canadian painter. A contemporary and friend of Emily Carr, Uhthoff was known for establishing her own art school; the Victoria School of Art, writing columns for the Daily Colonist newspaper, and exhibiting her own art.

== Biography ==
Uhthoff was born in 1889 in Kirn, Argyll, Scotland. She grew up in Glasgow, graduating from the Glasgow School of Art in 1912. Following her graduation she exhibited at the Royal Glasgow Institute of the Fine Arts and the Royal Scottish Academy.

In 1913, Uhthoff traveled to the Kootenays in British Columbia to visit friends. While there she met the homesteader, Edward Joseph (Ted) Uhthoff. With the outbreak of World War I Uhthoff returned to Glasgow, where she taught elementary school.

In 1919, Ina and Ted were married, returned to British Columbia, and started a family.

In 1926, Uhthoff relocated to Victoria with her two children. There she continued her teaching career, providing private lessons, teaching at public and private schools, and a correspondence course. She called her private studio the Victoria School of Art which operated from 1926 to 1942. She was forced to close the school at the beginning of World War II.

In the late 1920s, she worked with Emily Carr to bring Mark Tobey from Seattle, Washington to teach a class.

In 1934, her work appeared in the Vancouver Art Gallery's 3rd. Annual B.C Artists exhibit (Alpine Meadows, Windswept Tree) alongside Group Of Seven artist Fred Varley.

In 1945, Uhthoff began running a small gallery called the Little Centre, a precursor to the Art Gallery of Greater Victoria. She served on the board of directors into the 1960s.

Concurrent with her teaching career, Uhthoff exhibited her own work at the British Columbia Society of Artists, and at the Art Gallery of Greater Victoria.

Uhthoff died in 1971 in Carleton Place, Ontario.

== Legacy ==
In 1972, the Art Gallery of Greater Victoria held a memorial exhibition of her work.

Her work is currently held in the Burnaby Art Gallery, Art Gallery of Greater Victoria, the BC Archives, and elsewhere.

In 2017, her work was included in the exhibition, The Ornament of a House: Fifty Years of Collecting at the Burnaby Art Gallery.
