= Menatetrenone =

Form of vitamin K

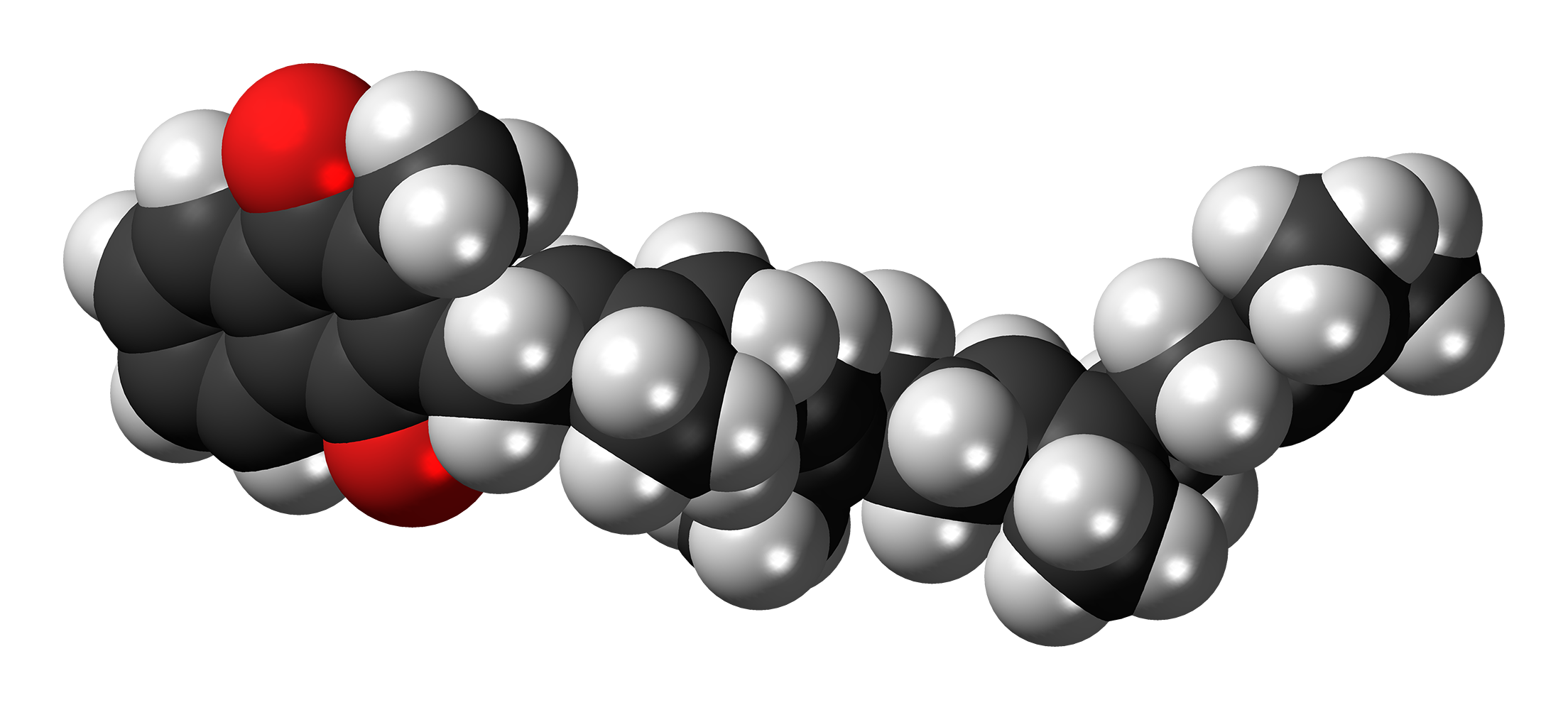

Clinical data
- Other names: 3-methyl-2-[(2Z,6E,10E)-3,7,11,15-tetramethylhexadeca-2,6,10,14-tetraenyl]naphthalene-1,4-dione
- AHFS/Drugs.com: International Drug Names
- Routes of administration: By mouth
- ATC code: M05BX08 (WHO)

Pharmacokinetic data
- Bioavailability: Low (oral)

Identifiers
- IUPAC name: 2-methyl-3-[(2Z,6E,10E)-3,7,11,15-tetramethylhexadeca-2,6,10,14-tetraen-1-yl]naphthoquinone
- CAS Number: 863-61-6
- PubChem CID: 5282367
- ChemSpider: 4445530
- UNII: 27Y876D139
- KEGG: D00100
- ChEBI: CHEBI:78277
- CompTox Dashboard (EPA): DTXSID6048969

Chemical and physical data
- Formula: C_{31}H_{40}O_{2}
- Molar mass: 444.659 g·mol^{−1}
- 3D model (JSmol): Interactive image
- SMILES: CC1=C(C(=O)C2=CC=CC=C2C1=O)C/C=C(\C)/CC/C=C(\C)/CC/C=C(\C)/CCC=C(C)C
- InChI: InChI=1S/C31H40O2/c1-22(2)12-9-13-23(3)14-10-15-24(4)16-11-17-25(5)20-21-27-26(6)30(32)28-18-7-8-19-29(28)31(27)33/h7-8,12,14,16,18-20H,9-11,13,15,17,21H2,1-6H3/b23-14+,24-16+,25-20+; Key:DKHGMERMDICWDU-GHDNBGIDSA-N

Menatetrenone (INN), also known as menaquinone-4 (MK-4), is one of the nine forms of vitamin K_{2}.

== Biology ==
MK-4 is the major form of Vitamin K in vertebrate animals, including humans and common forms of meat animals. It is produced via conversion of vitamin K_{1} in the body, specifically in the testes, pancreas and arterial walls. The conversion is not dependent on gut bacteria, occurring in germ-free rats and in parenterally-administered K_{1} in rats. Tissues that accumulate high amounts of MK-4 have a capacity to convert up to 90% of the available K_{1} into MK-4.

K_{1} is converted to MK-4 in three steps:

- Removal of the phytyl tail to form menadione (K3; unknown enzyme);
- Reduction of menadione to menadiol (likely NQO1);
- Attachment of GGPP tail to form menaquinol-4, the reduced form of MK-4 (UBIAD1)

The second and third steps are known to happen in target tissue. The first step is proposed to happen mainly in the intestines.

== As a medication ==
Menatetrenone is approved in Japan for second-line treatment of postmenopausal osteoporosis. Evidence is restricted to small-scale RCTs; the minimum effective dose (for bone mass parameters) is 45 mg, much higher than the Daily Value for vitamin K (80 μg).

=== Bioavailbility and dose ===
420 μg of oral MK-4, in a single-dose or spread out over 7 days, does not cause detectable changes in serum MK-4 level in healthy women, whereas MK-7 produces the expected increases in MK-7 levels.

The minimum effective oral dose to change serum osteocalcin levels is 1500 μg/d, where as oral MK-7 is effective on this parameter at 45 μg/d, a level more in line with nutritional intake. In addition, rat studies show that oral MK-7 is better at increasing extrahepatic tissue levels of MK-4 than oral MK-4.
