= UBIAD1 =

Protein found in humans

Identifiers
- Aliases: UBIAD1, SCCD, TERE1, UbiA prenyltransferase domain containing 1
- External IDs: OMIM: 611632; MGI: 1918957; GeneCards: UBIAD1
Enzyme activity
EC #	BRENDA	ExPASy	KEGG	MetaCyc
2.5.1.39	↗	↗	↗	↗

Gene location (Human)
Chr.	Chromosome 1 (human)
Band	1p36.22	Start	11,273,198 bp
Band	1p36.22	End	11,296,049 bp

Gene location (Mouse)
Chr.	Chromosome 4 (mouse)
Band	4|4 E2	Start	148,518,952 bp
Band	4|4 E2	End	148,529,228 bp
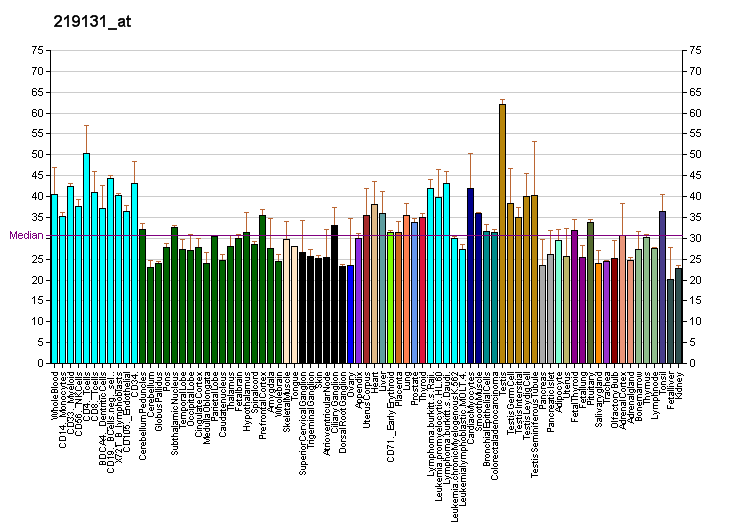
RNA expression pattern
Bgee	Human / Mouse (ortholog); Top expressed in: gastrocnemius muscle; muscle of thigh; gonad; secondary oocyte; skin of thigh; ganglionic eminence; islet of Langerhans; nipple; granulocyte; ventricular zone / Top expressed in: zygote; proximal tubule; right kidney; secondary oocyte; primary oocyte; human kidney; interventricular septum; yolk sac; muscle of thigh; Rostral migratory stream; More reference expression data
BioGPS	More reference expression data
Gene ontology
Molecular function	transferase activity; antioxidant activity; protein binding; prenyltransferase activity; transferase activity, transferring alkyl or aryl (other than methyl) groups
Cellular component	cytoplasm; integral component of membrane; integral component of Golgi membrane; Golgi apparatus; endoplasmic reticulum membrane; membrane; mitochondrial membranes; Golgi membrane; endoplasmic reticulum; mitochondrion; nucleus
Biological process	menaquinone biosynthetic process; ubiquinone biosynthetic process; vitamin K biosynthetic process; vitamin K metabolic process; cellular oxidant detoxification; ubiquinone biosynthetic process via 3,4-dihydroxy-5-polyprenylbenzoate
Sources:Amigo / QuickGO
Orthologs
Databases	NCBI: entry; OMA: entry
Species	Human	Mouse
Entrez	29914	71707
Ensembl	ENSG00000120942	ENSMUSG00000047719
UniProt	Q9Y5Z9	Q9DC60
RefSeq (mRNA)	NM_013319; NM_001330349; NM_001330350	NM_027873
RefSeq (protein)	NP_001317278; NP_001317279; NP_037451	NP_082149
Location (UCSC)	Chr 1: 11.27 – 11.3 Mb	Chr 4: 148.52 – 148.53 Mb
PubMed search
- Wikidata
View/Edit Human	View/Edit Mouse

UbiA prenyltransferase domain-containing protein 1 (UBIAD1) also known as transitional epithelial response protein 1 (TERE1) is a protein that in humans is encoded by the UBIAD1 gene.

The enzyme is named for its canonical role in ubiquinone production, catalyzing reaction EC 2.5.1.39; it thus has a role in oxidative stress pathways.

Recent evidence suggests that UBIAD1 has enzymatic activity in the vitamin K pathway, converting menadione to MK-4. This translates to a role in blood vessel development in zebrafish.

== Clinical significance ==
Mutations of the UBIAD1 gene cause Schnyder crystalline corneal dystrophy.
