= Sodium bicarbonate cotransporter 3 =

Protein-coding gene in the species Homo sapiens

SLC4A7

Identifiers
- Aliases: SLC4A7, NBC2, NBC3, NBCN1, SBC2, SLC4A6, solute carrier family 4 member 7
- External IDs: OMIM: 603353; MGI: 2443878; GeneCards: SLC4A7

Gene location (Human)
Chr.	Chromosome 3 (human)
Band	3p24.1	Start	27,372,721 bp
Band	3p24.1	End	27,484,420 bp

Gene location (Mouse)
Chr.	Chromosome 14 (mouse)
Band	14|14 A1	Start	14,702,279 bp
Band	14|14 A1	End	14,799,940 bp
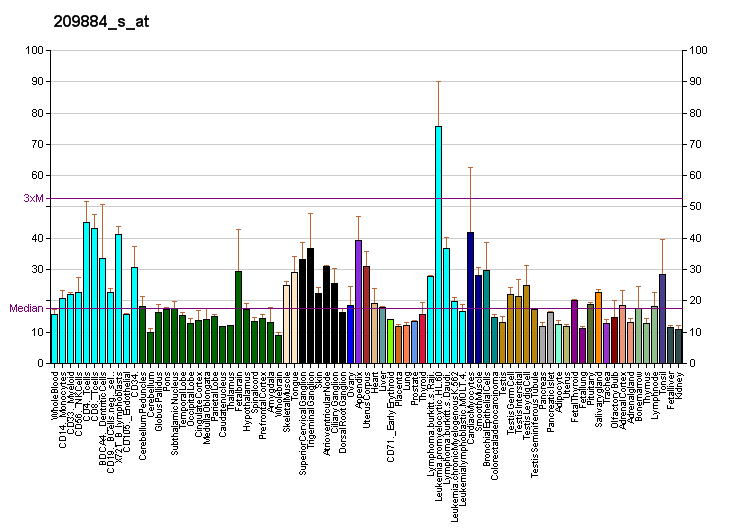

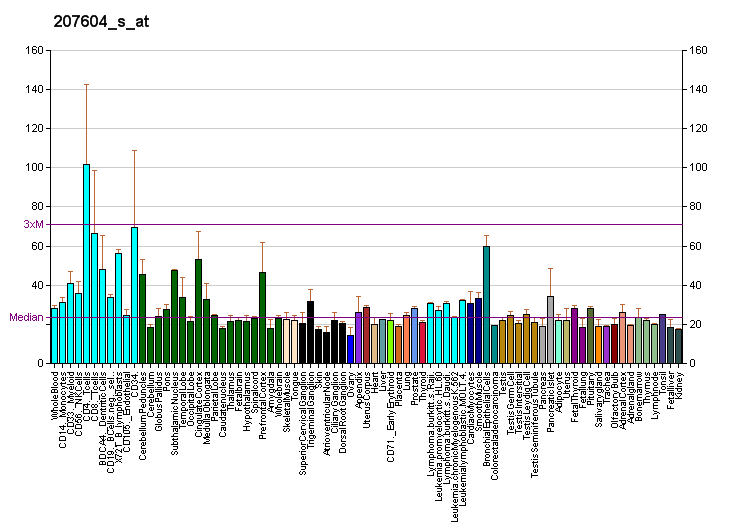

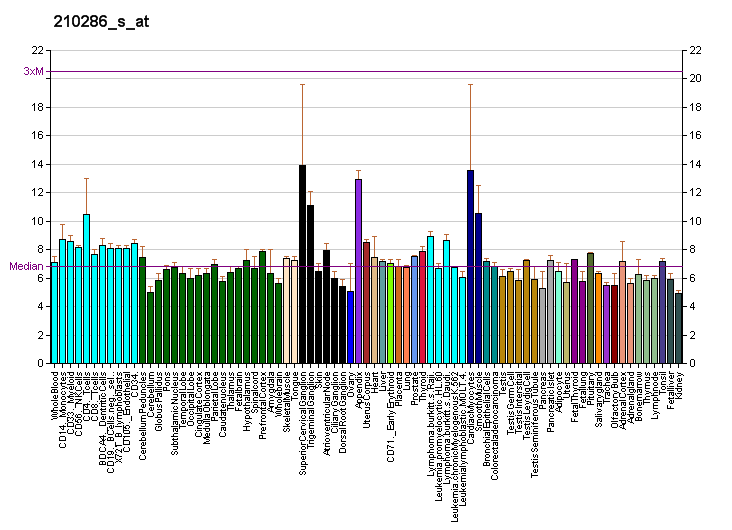
RNA expression pattern
Bgee	Human / Mouse (ortholog); Top expressed in: oocyte; duodenum; Achilles tendon; jejunal mucosa; secondary oocyte; lactiferous duct; sural nerve; frontal pole; paraflocculus of cerebellum; Brodmann area 23 / Top expressed in: duodenum; left colon; retina; olfactory epithelium; neural layer of retina; medial ganglionic eminence; islet of Langerhans; uterus; soleus muscle; spermatid; More reference expression data
BioGPS	More reference expression data
Gene ontology
Molecular function	inorganic anion exchanger activity; symporter activity; anion transmembrane transporter activity; sodium:bicarbonate symporter activity; protein binding
Cellular component	integral component of membrane; cell projection; membrane; plasma membrane; synapse; stereocilium; basolateral plasma membrane; apical plasma membrane; cytoplasmic vesicle; integral component of plasma membrane
Biological process	sodium ion transport; anion transport; auditory receptor cell development; ion transport; inorganic anion transport; regulation of intracellular pH; bicarbonate transport; transmembrane transport; anion transmembrane transport
Sources:Amigo / QuickGO
Orthologs
Databases	NCBI: entry; OMA: entry
Species	Human	Mouse
Entrez	9497	218756
Ensembl	ENSG00000033867	ENSMUSG00000021733
UniProt	Q9Y6M7	Q8BTY2
RefSeq (mRNA)	NM_001258379; NM_001258380; NM_003615; NM_001321103; NM_001321104 NM_001321105; NM_001321106; NM_001321107; NM_001321108	NM_001033270
RefSeq (protein)	NP_001245308; NP_001245309; NP_001308032; NP_001308033; NP_001308034 NP_001308035; NP_001308036; NP_001308037; NP_003606	n/a
Location (UCSC)	Chr 3: 27.37 – 27.48 Mb	Chr 14: 14.7 – 14.8 Mb
PubMed search
- Wikidata
View/Edit Human	View/Edit Mouse

Sodium bicarbonate cotransporter 3 is a protein which in humans is encoded by the SLC4A7 gene.

== See also ==
- Solute carrier family
