= Electrogenic sodium bicarbonate cotransporter 4 =

Protein-coding gene in the species Homo sapiens

SLC4A5

Identifiers
- Aliases: SLC4A5, NBC4, NBCe2, solute carrier family 4 member 5
- External IDs: OMIM: 606757; MGI: 2443220; GeneCards: SLC4A5

Gene location (Human)
Chr.	Chromosome 2 (human)
Band	2p13.1	Start	74,216,242 bp
Band	2p13.1	End	74,343,416 bp

Gene location (Mouse)
Chr.	Chromosome 6 (mouse)
Band	6|6 C3	Start	83,196,810 bp
Band	6|6 C3	End	83,281,927 bp
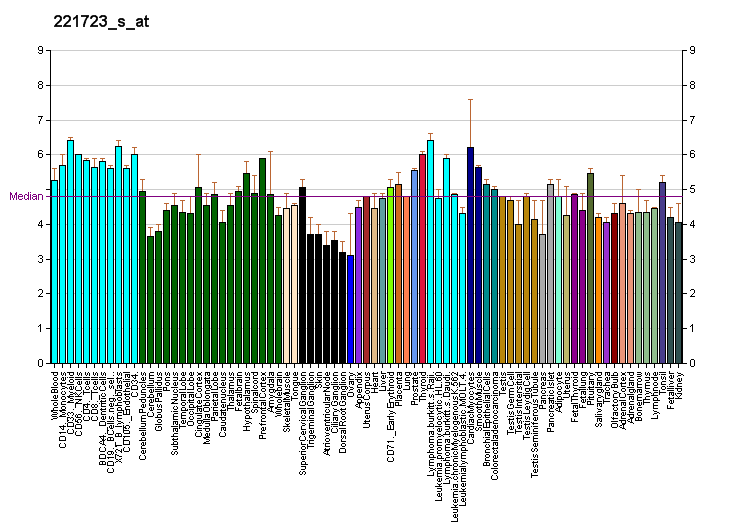
RNA expression pattern
Bgee	Human / Mouse (ortholog); Top expressed in: sural nerve; thyroid gland; right lobe of thyroid gland; left lobe of thyroid gland; right testis; left testis; testicle; corpus callosum; cerebellar hemisphere; right hemisphere of cerebellum / Top expressed in: choroid plexus of fourth ventricle; retinal pigment epithelium; Epithelium of choroid plexus; ciliary body; iris; zygote; secondary oocyte; neural layer of retina; right lung; right lung lobe; More reference expression data
BioGPS	More reference expression data
Gene ontology
Molecular function	inorganic anion exchanger activity; anion transmembrane transporter activity; sodium:bicarbonate symporter activity
Cellular component	integral component of membrane; membrane; plasma membrane; apical plasma membrane; integral component of plasma membrane
Biological process	epithelial cell development; renal system process; sodium ion transport; anion transport; retina development in camera-type eye; mitochondrion distribution; regulation of systemic arterial blood pressure; regulation of gene expression; cerebrospinal fluid secretion; ion transport; inorganic anion transport; regulation of intracellular pH; bicarbonate transport; anion transmembrane transport
Sources:Amigo / QuickGO
Orthologs
Databases	NCBI: entry; OMA: entry
Species	Human	Mouse
Entrez	57835	232156
Ensembl	ENSG00000188687	ENSMUSG00000068323
UniProt	Q9BY07	n/a
RefSeq (mRNA)	NM_133479; NM_021196; NM_033323; NM_133478; NM_001386136	NM_001166067
RefSeq (protein)	NP_067019; NP_597812	n/a
Location (UCSC)	Chr 2: 74.22 – 74.34 Mb	Chr 6: 83.2 – 83.28 Mb
PubMed search
- Wikidata
View/Edit Human	View/Edit Mouse

Electrogenic sodium bicarbonate cotransporter 4 is a protein that in humans is encoded by the SLC4A5 gene.

== Function ==
This gene encodes a member of the sodium bicarbonate cotransporter (NBC) family, part of the bicarbonate transporter superfamily. Sodium bicarbonate cotransporters are involved in intracellular pH regulation and electroneutral or electrogenic sodium bicarbonate transport. This protein is thought to be an integral membrane protein. Multiple transcript variants encoding different isoforms have been found for this gene, but the biological validity of some variants has not been determined.

== Clinical significance ==
This human gene has been identified as a hypertension susceptibility gene based on the association of single nucleotide polymorphisms with blood pressure (BP) levels and hypertension status.

== See also ==
- SLC4A5+protein,+human at the U.S. National Library of Medicine Medical Subject Headings (MeSH)
