= Keratin 3 =

Protein in humans

KRT3

Identifiers
- Aliases: KRT3, CK3, K3, keratin 3, MECD2
- External IDs: OMIM: 148043; GeneCards: KRT3

Gene location (Human)
Chr.	Chromosome 12 (human)
Band	12q13.13	Start	52,789,685 bp
Band	12q13.13	End	52,796,117 bp
RNA expression pattern
Bgee	Human / Mouse (ortholog); Top expressed in: gums; skin of abdomen; vagina; skin of limb; skin of leg; tonsil; islet of Langerhans; cervix; salivary gland; right lobe of thyroid gland / n/a; More reference expression data
BioGPS	n/a
Gene ontology
Molecular function	structural molecule activity
Cellular component	keratin filament; extracellular exosome; intermediate filament; cytosol
Biological process	epithelial cell differentiation; intermediate filament cytoskeleton organization; keratinization; cornification
Sources:Amigo / QuickGO
Orthologs
Databases	NCBI: entry; OMA: entry
Species	Human	Mouse
Entrez	3850	n/a
Ensembl	ENSG00000186442	n/a
UniProt	P12035	n/a
RefSeq (mRNA)	NM_057088	n/a
RefSeq (protein)	NP_476429	n/a
Location (UCSC)	Chr 12: 52.79 – 52.8 Mb	n/a
PubMed search		n/a
- Wikidata
View/Edit Human

Keratin 3 also known as cytokeratin 3 is a protein that in humans is encoded by the KRT3 gene. Keratin 3 is a type II cytokeratin. It is specifically found in the corneal epithelium together with keratin 12.

Mutations in the KRT3 encoding this protein have been associated with Meesmanns Corneal Dystrophy.
