= DIDS =

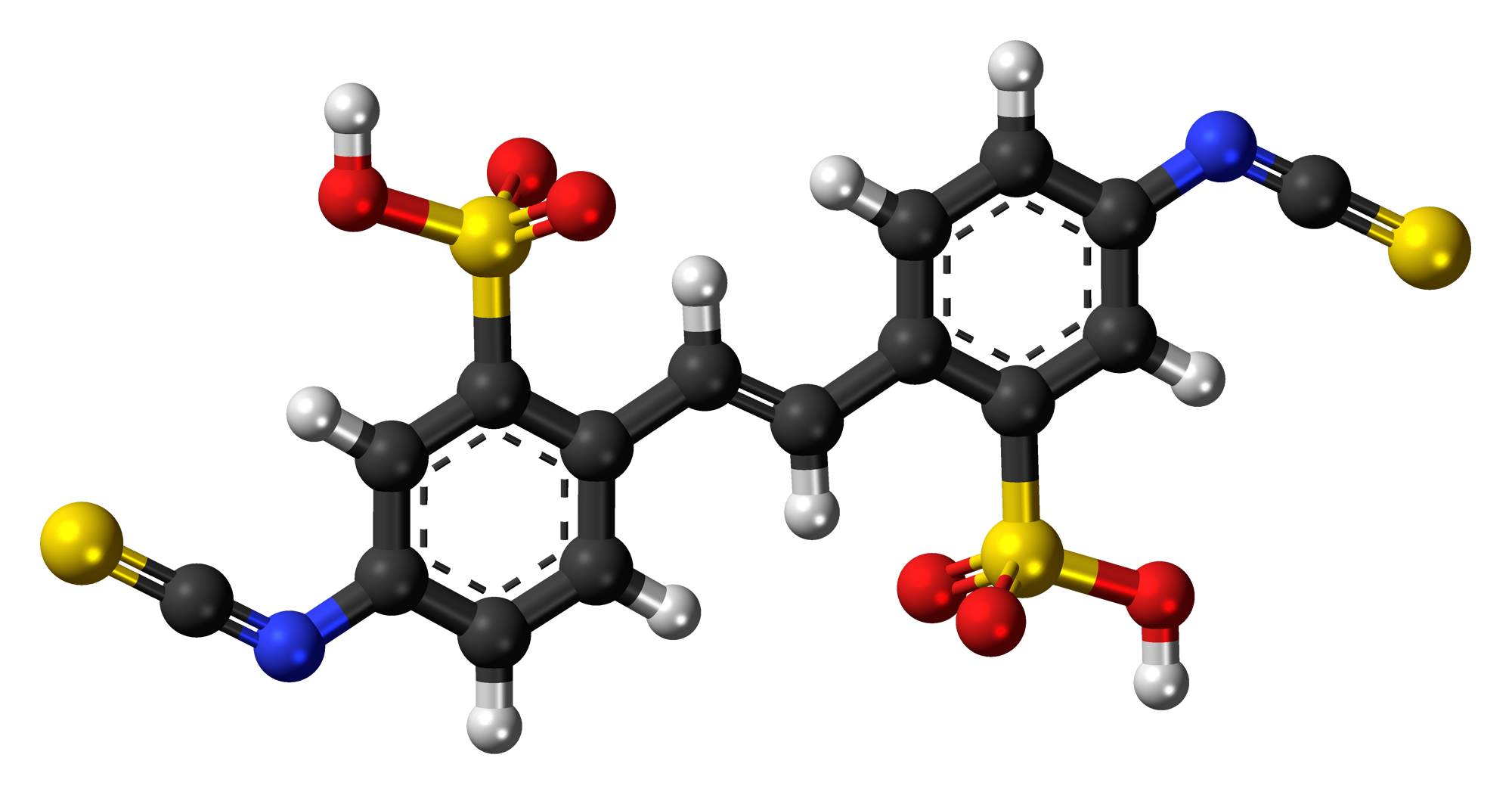

Names
- Preferred IUPAC name 2,2′-(Ethene-1,2-diyl)bis(5-isothiocyanatobenzene-1-sulfonic acid)
- Other names 5-Isothiocyanato-2-[2-(4-isothiocyanato-2-sulfophenyl)ethenyl]benzenesulfonic acid

Identifiers
CAS Number	53005-05-3 (E)
3D model (JSmol)	Interactive image
Abbreviations	DIDS
Beilstein Reference	6543839
ChEBI	CHEBI:36511
ChemSpider	37094; 4445228 (E); 7827632 (Z)
ECHA InfoCard	100.152.489
IUPHAR/BPS	4177
KEGG	C11591
MeSH	4,4'-Diisothiocyanostilbene-2,2'-disulfonic+acid
PubChem CID	40600; 5281951 (E); 9548709 (Z)
UNII	QHR3Z2PN8M (E)
CompTox Dashboard (EPA)	DTXSID701027549 DTXSID20164976, DTXSID701027549
- InChI: InChI=1S/C16H10N2O6S4/c19-27(20,21)15-7-13(17-9-25)5-3-11(15)1-2-12-4-6-14(18-10-26)8-16(12)28(22,23)24/h1-8H,(H,19,20,21)(H,22,23,24) Key: YSCNMFDFYJUPEF-UHFFFAOYSA-N
- SMILES: OS(=O)(=O)C1=C(C=CC2=C(C=C(C=C2)N=C=S)S(O)(=O)=O)C=CC(=C1)N=C=S

Properties
Chemical formula	C_{16}H_{10}N_{2}O_{6}S_{4}
Molar mass	454.50 g·mol^{−1}
Melting point	400 °C (752 °F; 673 K)
log P	4.72
Acidity (pK_{a})	−3.21, −1.428, −0.37, 0.23
Basicity (pK_{b})	13.77, 14.37, 15.425, 17.21
- Except where otherwise noted, data are given for materials in their standard state (at 25 °C [77 °F], 100 kPa). Infobox references

4,4′-Diisothiocyano-2,2′-stilbenedisulfonic acid (DIDS) is an anion exchange inhibitor, blocking reversibly, and later irreversibly, exchangers such as chloride-bicarbonate exchanger.
