= Salicylate decarboxylase =

Class of enzymes

Identifiers
- EC no.: 4.1.1.91

Databases
- BRENDA: enzyme data
- ExPASy: NiceZyme view
- KEGG: enzyme entry
- MetaCyc: metabolic pathway
- Rhea: reactions
- PDB structures: RCSB PDB PDBe PDBsum
Search
- PMC: articles
- PubMed: articles
- NCBI: proteins

Salicylate decarboxylase (EC 4.1.1.91, salicylic acid decarboxylase, Scd) is an enzyme characterised from Trichosporon moniliiforme with systematic name salicylate carboxy-lyase. It catalyses the decarboxylation of salicylic acid to phenol and carbon dioxide. It can also perform carboxylation in the reverse direction, which is analogous to the Kolbe–Schmitt reaction.

salicylic acid
CO_{2}
CO_{2}
phenol

Biosynthetic pathways involving this enzyme have been suggested both for the sustainable production of phenol, and the production of salicylic acid derivatives.
