= Uhthoff's phenomenon =

Worsening of neurologic symptoms in multiple sclerosis caused by heat

- Other names: Uhthoff's syndrome, Uhthoff's sign, Uhthoff's symptom
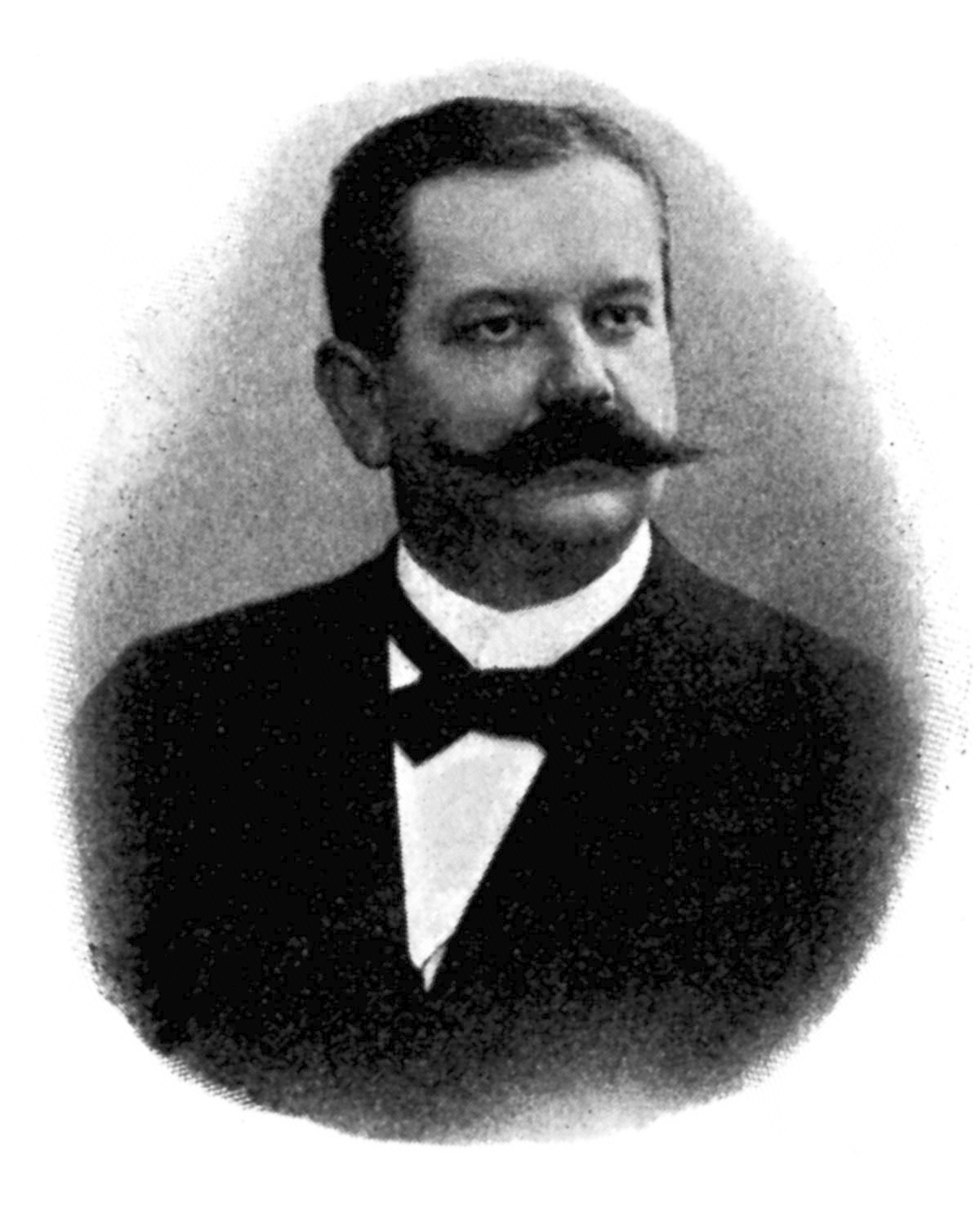
- Wilhelm Uhthoff
- Specialty: Neurology
- Symptoms: fatigue, pain, urinary urgency, worse optic neuritis
- Causes: high body temperature, causes longer inactivation of voltage-gated sodium channels
- Diagnostic method: based on symptoms
- Differential diagnosis: degeneration of condition of multiple sclerosis
- Prevention: keeping cool, use of cool clothing
- Treatment: cool clothing
- Medication: none
- Prognosis: typically completely reversible
- Frequency: 60-80% of people with multiple sclerosis
- Deaths: 0

Uhthoff's phenomenon (also known as Uhthoff's syndrome, Uhthoff's sign, and Uhthoff's symptom) is the worsening of neurologic symptoms in multiple sclerosis (MS) and other demyelinating diseases when the body is overheated. This may occur due to hot weather, exercise, fever, saunas, hot tubs, hot baths/showers, and hot food and drink. Increased temperature slows nerve conduction, but the exact mechanism remains unknown. With an increased body temperature, nerve impulses are either blocked or slowed in a damaged nerve. Once the body temperature is normalized, signs and symptoms typically reverse.

== Signs and symptoms ==
Symptoms of Uhthoff's phenomenon occur when exposed to heat, and include:

- fatigue
- pain
- concentration difficulties
- urinary urgency
- worsening of existing optic neuropathy (although optic neuropathy may occur for the first time)
- muscle stiffness
- dizziness and unsteadiness

== Causes ==
Uhthoff's phenomenon is caused by a raised body temperature. This may be caused by:

- hot weather
- exercise
- fever
- saunas
- sun tanning
- hot tubs, and hot baths and showers
- hot food and drink
- menstruation (which may raise body temperature)
- sitting near a radiator

== Mechanism ==
The exact mechanism of Uhthoff's phenomenon is unknown. It causes a decrease in the speed of action potentials in the central nervous system (CNS). Heat may increase the time when voltage-gated sodium channels are inactivated, which delays further action potentials. This is worsened by the demyelination caused by MS. Other theories have considered the role of heat shock proteins and changes to blood flow.

Peripheral nerve studies have shown that even a 0.5 °C increase in body temperature can slow or block the conduction of nerve impulses in demyelinated nerves. With greater levels of demyelination, a smaller increase in temperature is needed to slow down the nerve impulse conduction. Exercising and normal daily activities can cause a significant increase in body temperature in individuals with MS, especially if their mechanical efficiency is poor due to the use of mobility aids, ataxia, weakness, and spasticity. However, exercise has been shown to be helpful in managing MS symptoms, reducing the risk of comorbidities, and promoting overall wellness.

== Diagnosis ==
Diagnosis of Uhthoff's phenomenon is clinical and based on symptoms when it occurs in a person who is already diagnosed with MS. The main differential diagnosis is a more serious worsening of MS symptoms.

== Prevention and management ==
Many patients with MS tend to avoid saunas, warm baths, and other sources of heat. They may wear ice or evaporative cooling clothes, such as vests, neck wraps, armbands, wristbands, and hats. Taking advantage of the cooling properties of water may help attenuate the consequences of heat sensitivity. Exercise pre-cooling via lower body immersion in water of 16–17 °C for 30 minutes may allow heat sensitive individuals with MS to exercise more comfortably with fewer side effects by minimizing body temperature increases during exercise. Hydrotherapy exercise in moderately cool water of 27–29 °C water can also be advantageous to individuals with MS. Temperatures lower than 27 °C are not recommended because of the increased risk of invoking spasticity.

== Prognosis ==
Uhthoff's phenomenon is a temporary problem, and typically completely reverses once body temperature returns to normal. This may take up to 24 hours.

== Epidemiology ==
Uhthoff's phenomenon may affect any person with a demyelinating disease. This is most commonly MS, but it may also occur with neuromyelitis optica spectrum disorder or Guillain-Barré Syndrome. It affects between 60% and 80% of people with MS.

== History ==
Uhthoff's phenomenon was first described by Wilhelm Uhthoff in 1890 as a temporary worsening of vision with exercise in patients with optic neuritis. Later research revealed the link between neurological signs such as visual loss and increased heat production and Uhthoff's belief that exercise was the etiology of visual loss was replaced by the conclusions of these later researchers stating that heat was the prime etiology.
