= Wilhelm Uhthoff =

German ophthalmologist (1853–1927)

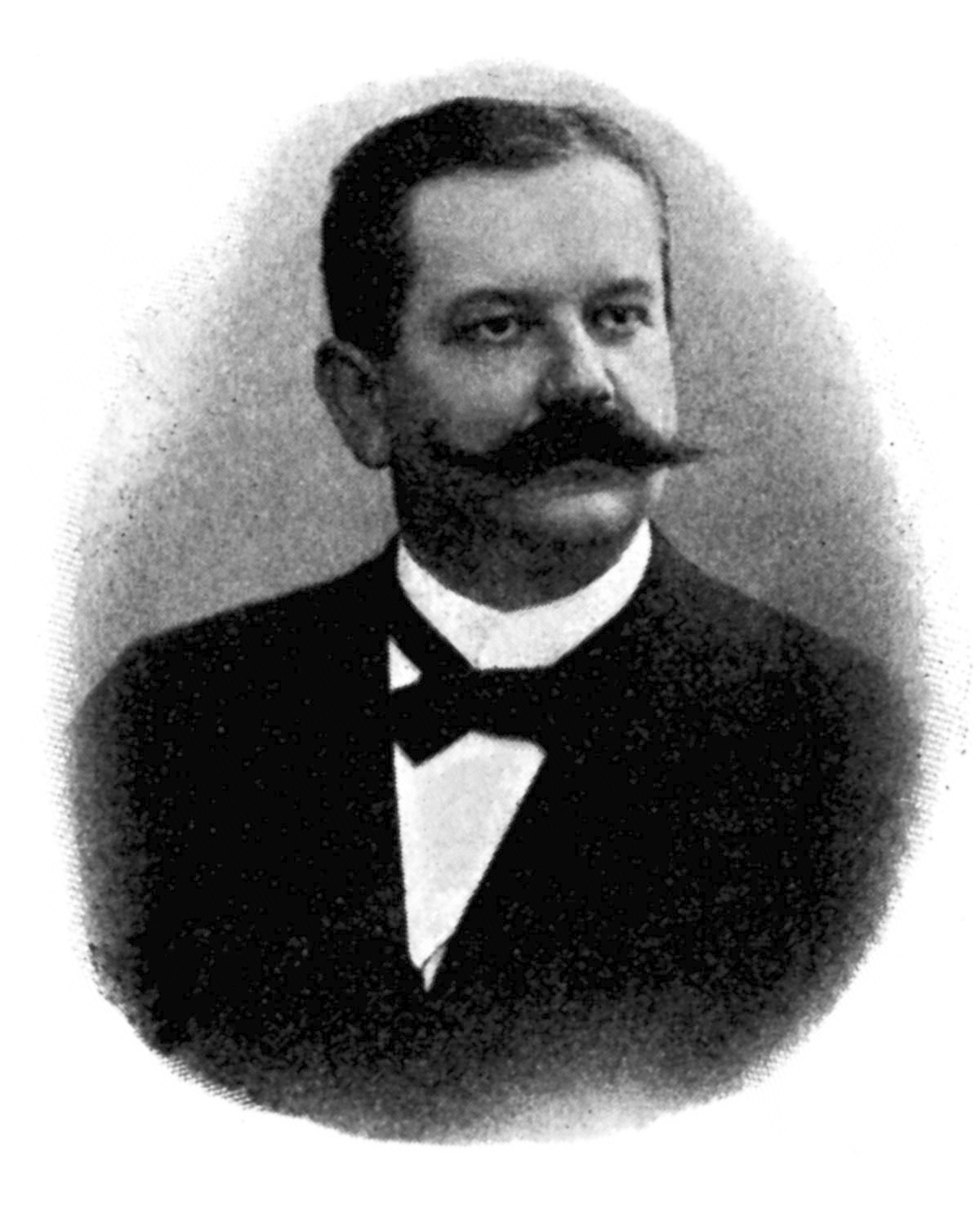
- Wilhelm Uhthoff
- Born: 31 July 1853
- Died: 21 March 1927 (aged 73)
- Education: University of Berlin
- Known for: Uhthoff's phenomenon
- Scientific career
- Fields: ophthalmology
- Workplaces: University of Marburg

Wilhelm Uhthoff (31 July 1853 – 21 March 1927) was a German ophthalmologist born in Klein-Warin.

In 1877 earned his doctorate at the University of Berlin, and later became a professor of ophthalmology at the Universities of Marburg (1890) and Breslau (1896), where he succeeded Carl Friedrich Richard Förster (1825–1902).

Uhthoff specialized in the study of ophthalmological disorders that were related to the central nervous system. In 1890 he described a condition of temporary vision loss linked to physical exercise, and associated with optic neuritis. This condition was to become known as Uhthoff's phenomenon, and was later found to be caused by a rise in body temperature.

In 1915 he published a treatise titled Augensymptome bei Grosshirntumoren in which gave an early description of a neuro-ophthalmic disorder that was to become known as Foster Kennedy syndrome. However, the disease was to be named after Robert Foster Kennedy (1884–1952), who provided a more comprehensive (and earlier) account of the disorder.

== Written works ==
- Untersuchungen über die bei der multiplen Herdsklerose vorkommenden Augenstörungen. Archiv für Psychiatrie und Nervenkrankheiten, Berlin, 1890, 21: 55–116 and 303–410. W. Uhthoff
- Die Augenstörungen bei Vergiftungen Handbuch der Augenheilkunde, 2nd edition, volume 11, 2 A. Leipzig, 1911.
- Über die bei der Syphilis des Centralnervensystems vorkommenden Augenstörungen. Leipzig, 1894.
- Über die Augensymptome bei den Erkrankungen des Nervensystems. Handbuch der Augenheilkunde, 2nd edition, volume 11, 2 B. Leipzig, 1915.
- Stereoscopischer ophthalmolog. Atlas. 2. Folge, Leipzig.
- Augensymptome bei Grosshirntumoren. Gräfe-Sämisch: Handbuch der Augenheilkunde, 1915. Volume I: 1143. (Foster Kennedy's syndrome).
- Beziehungen der Allgemeinleiden und Organerkrankungen zu Veränderungen und Krankheiten des sehorganes. (written with Arthur Groenouw. in: Edwin Theodor Saemisch's Handbuch der gesammten Augenheilkunde).
