= Schnyder crystalline corneal dystrophy =

- Other names: Crystalline stromal dystrophy, Schnyder crystalline dystrophy sine crystals, Hereditary crystalline stromal dystrophy of Schnyder , Schnyder's crystalline corneal dystrophy
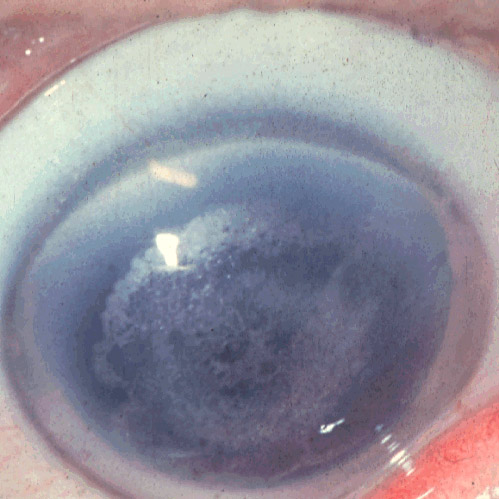
- Schnyder corneal dystrophy. Crystalline opacities are evident in the central cornea (Courtesy Dr. G.N. Foulks)
- Specialty: Ophthalmology

Schnyder crystalline corneal dystrophy (SCD) is a rare form of corneal dystrophy. It is caused by heterozygous mutations in UBIAD1 gene. Cells in the cornea accumulate cholesterol and phosopholipid deposits leading to the opacity, in severe cases requiring corneal transplants. Abnormal cholesterol metabolism has been noted in other cell types of affected patients (skin fibroblasts) suggesting that this may be a systemic disorder with clinical manifestations limited to the cornea.
