= Sodium bicarbonate transporter-like protein 11 =

Protein-coding gene in the species Homo sapiens

SLC4A11

Identifiers
- Aliases: SLC4A11, BTR1, CDPD1, CHED2, NABC1, dJ794I6.2, CHED, solute carrier family 4 member 11
- External IDs: OMIM: 610206; MGI: 2138987; GeneCards: SLC4A11

Gene location (Human)
Chr.	Chromosome 20 (human)
Band	20p13	Start	3,227,417 bp
Band	20p13	End	3,239,559 bp

Gene location (Mouse)
Chr.	Chromosome 2 (mouse)
Band	2|2 F1	Start	130,526,033 bp
Band	2|2 F1	End	130,539,439 bp
RNA expression pattern
Bgee	Human / Mouse (ortholog); Top expressed in: nasal epithelium; olfactory zone of nasal mucosa; left lobe of thyroid gland; pancreatic ductal cell; parotid gland; minor salivary glands; right lobe of thyroid gland; gingival epithelium; mucosa of paranasal sinus; bronchial epithelial cell / Top expressed in: vestibular membrane of cochlear duct; lumbar spinal ganglion; inner renal medulla; morula; gastrula; blastocyst; outer renal medulla; cochlea; iris; olfactory epithelium; More reference expression data
BioGPS	n/a
Gene ontology
Molecular function	proton channel activity; protein dimerization activity; sodium channel activity; bicarbonate transmembrane transporter activity; active borate transmembrane transporter activity; inorganic anion exchanger activity; symporter activity
Cellular component	integral component of membrane; membrane; plasma membrane; basolateral plasma membrane; integral component of plasma membrane
Biological process	ion homeostasis; sodium ion transport; cellular cation homeostasis; ion transport; anion transport; fluid transport; bicarbonate transport; anion transmembrane transport; borate transport; sodium ion transmembrane transport; borate transmembrane transport; regulation of intracellular pH; proton transmembrane transport
Sources:Amigo / QuickGO
Orthologs
Databases	NCBI: entry; OMA: entry
Species	Human	Mouse
Entrez	83959	269356
Ensembl	ENSG00000088836	ENSMUSG00000074796
UniProt	Q8NBS3	A2AJN7
RefSeq (mRNA)	NM_001174089; NM_001174090; NM_032034; NM_001363745; NM_001400277 NM_001400278; NM_001400279; NM_001400280	NM_001081162
RefSeq (protein)	NP_001167560; NP_001167561; NP_114423; NP_001350674	NP_001074631
Location (UCSC)	Chr 20: 3.23 – 3.24 Mb	Chr 2: 130.53 – 130.54 Mb
PubMed search
- Wikidata
View/Edit Human	View/Edit Mouse

Sodium bicarbonate transporter-like protein 11 is a protein that in humans is encoded by the SLC4A11 gene.

== See also ==
- Solute carrier family
- Congenital endothelial dystrophy type 2
