= Keratin 12 =

Protein found in humans

KRT12

Identifiers
- Aliases: KRT12, K12, keratin 12, MECD1
- External IDs: OMIM: 601687; MGI: 96687; GeneCards: KRT12

Gene location (Human)
Chr.	Chromosome 17 (human)
Band	17q21.2	Start	40,861,303 bp
Band	17q21.2	End	40,867,223 bp

Gene location (Mouse)
Chr.	Chromosome 11 (mouse)
Band	11 D|11 62.92 cM	Start	99,306,492 bp
Band	11 D|11 62.92 cM	End	99,313,085 bp
RNA expression pattern
Bgee	Human / Mouse (ortholog); Top expressed in: gonad; testicle; mucosa of transverse colon; eye; duodenum; skin of abdomen; rectum; skin of leg; vagina; ectocervix / Top expressed in: corneal stroma; ciliary body; conjunctival fornix; epithelium of lens; retinal pigment epithelium; primary oocyte; olfactory tubercle; piriform cortex; secondary oocyte; iris; More reference expression data
BioGPS	n/a
Gene ontology
Molecular function	structural molecule activity
Cellular component	intermediate filament; extracellular exosome; cytosol
Biological process	visual perception; keratinization; cornification
Sources:Amigo / QuickGO
Orthologs
Databases	NCBI: entry; OMA: entry
Species	Human	Mouse
Entrez	3859	268482
Ensembl	ENSG00000187242	ENSMUSG00000020912
UniProt	Q99456	Q64291
RefSeq (mRNA)	NM_000223	NM_010661
RefSeq (protein)	NP_000214	NP_034791
Location (UCSC)	Chr 17: 40.86 – 40.87 Mb	Chr 11: 99.31 – 99.31 Mb
PubMed search
- Wikidata
View/Edit Human	View/Edit Mouse

Keratin 12 is a protein that in humans is encoded by the KRT12 gene. It is a type I keratin.

Keratin 12 is keratin found expressed in corneal epithelia. Mutations in the gene encoding this protein lead to Meesmann corneal dystrophy.
