= Reis–Bucklers corneal dystrophy =

Reis-Bücklers corneal dystrophy
- Other names: Corneal dystrophy of Bowman layer, type I
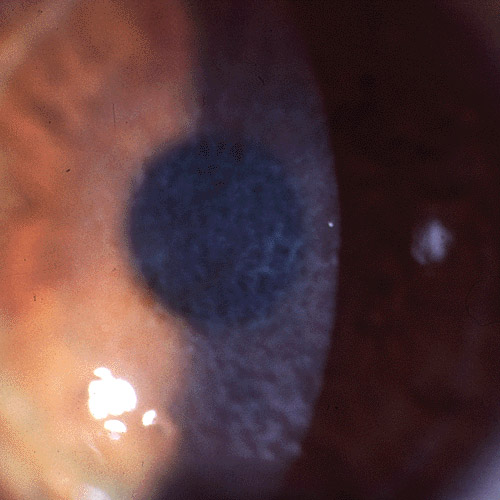
- Reis-Bücklers corneal dystrophy. Reticular opacity in the superficial cornea
- Specialty: Ophthalmology

Reis-Bücklers corneal dystrophy is a disease of the eye, a rare corneal dystrophy of unknown cause, in which the Bowman's layer of the cornea undergoes disintegration. The disorder is inherited in an autosomal dominant fashion, and is associated with mutations in the gene TGFB1.

Reis-Bücklers dystrophy causes a cloudiness in the corneas of both eyes, which may occur as early as 1 year of age, but usually develops by 4 to 5 years of age. It is usually evident within the first decade of life. This cloudiness, or opacity, causes the corneal epithelium to become elevated, which leads to corneal opacities. The corneal erosions may prompt attacks of redness and swelling in the eye (ocular hyperemia), eye pain, and photophobia. Significant vision loss may occur.

Reis-Bücklers dystrophy is diagnosed by clinical history physical examination of the eye. Laboratory and imaging studies are not necessary. Treatment may include a complete or partial corneal transplant, or photorefractive keratectomy.

== Signs and symptoms ==
Patients with Reis-Bücklers dystrophy develop a reticular pattern of cloudiness in the cornea. This cloudiness, or opacity, usually appears in both eyes (bilaterally) in the upper cornea by 4 or 5 years of age. The opacity elevates the corneal epithelium, eventually leading to corneal erosions that prompt attacks of ocular hyperemia, pain, and photophobia. These recurrent painful corneal epithelial erosions often begin as early as 1 year of age.

With time, the corneal changes progress into opacities in Bowman's layer, which gradually becomes more irregular and more dense. Significant vision loss may occur. However, vascularization of the cornea is not present.

== Pathogenesis ==
The disease has been associated with mutations in TGFBI gene on chromosome 5q which encodes for keratoepithelin. The inheritance is autosomal dominant.

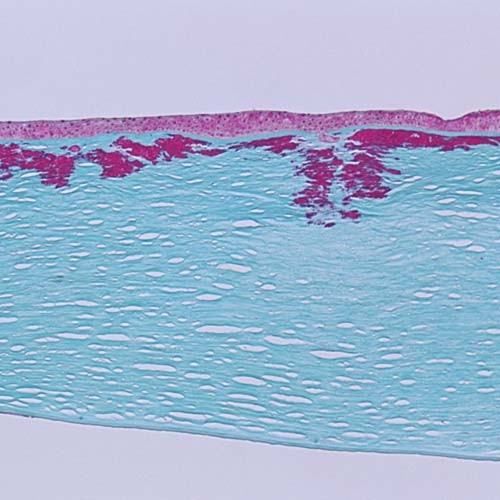
Reis-Bücklers corneal dystrophy. Light microscopy of cornea showing characteristic red stained deposits of mutated transforming growth factor beta-induced protein in the superficial corneal stroma. Masson's trichrome stain.

== Diagnosis ==
The diagnosis of Reis-Bücklers corneal dystrophy is based on the clinical presentation, rather than labs or imaging. Sometimes it is difficult to distinguish the disease from honeycomb dystrophy.

== Treatment ==
Treatment is aimed at managing the symptoms of the disease. A form of laser eye surgery named keratectomy may help with the superficial corneal scarring. In more severe cases, a partial or complete corneal transplantation may be considered. However, it is common for the dystrophy to recur within the grafted tissue.

== Epidemiology ==
Reis-Bücklers corneal dystrophy is not associated with any systemic conditions.

== History ==
The dystrophy was described in 1917 by Reis and in 1949 by Bücklers.

== See also ==
- Corneal dystrophy
