= TGFBI =

Protein-coding gene in the species Homo sapiens

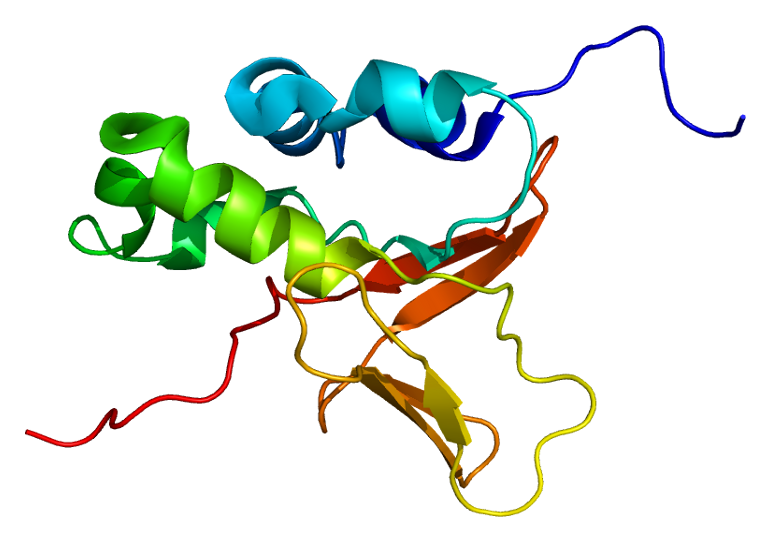

Identifiers
- Aliases: TGFBI, BIGH3, CDB1, CDG2, CDGG1, CSD, CSD1, CSD2, CSD3, EBMD, LCD1, transforming growth factor beta induced
- External IDs: OMIM: 601692; MGI: 99959; GeneCards: TGFBI
Available structures
PDB	Ortholog search: PDBe RCSB
PDB	List of PDB id codes 1X3B, 2LTB, 2LTC, 2VXP

Gene location (Human)
Chr.	Chromosome 5 (human)
Band	5q31.1	Start	136,028,988 bp
Band	5q31.1	End	136,063,818 bp

Gene location (Mouse)
Chr.	Chromosome 13 (mouse)
Band	13 B1|13 30.09 cM	Start	56,757,336 bp
Band	13 B1|13 30.09 cM	End	56,787,375 bp
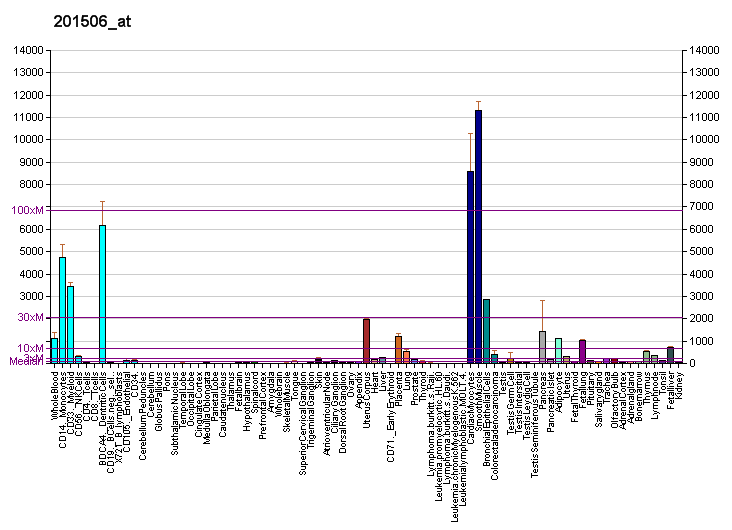
RNA expression pattern
Bgee	Human / Mouse (ortholog); Top expressed in: amniotic fluid; synovial joint; pericardium; tendon of biceps brachii; monocyte; synovial membrane; skin of hip; skin of thigh; skin of abdomen; gallbladder / Top expressed in: corneal stroma; skin of external ear; vas deferens; conjunctival fornix; ankle; umbilical cord; condyle; molar; tunica adventitia of aorta; Paneth cell; More reference expression data
BioGPS	More reference expression data
Gene ontology
Molecular function	integrin binding; protein binding; collagen binding; extracellular matrix binding; extracellular matrix structural constituent; cell adhesion molecule binding
Cellular component	extracellular matrix; basement membrane; trans-Golgi network; plasma membrane; extracellular exosome; extracellular space; extracellular region; collagen-containing extracellular matrix
Biological process	negative regulation of cell adhesion; cell population proliferation; chondrocyte differentiation; angiogenesis; response to stimulus; visual perception; cell adhesion; extracellular matrix organization
Sources:Amigo / QuickGO
Orthologs
Databases	NCBI: entry; OMA: entry
Species	Human	Mouse
Entrez	7045	21810
Ensembl	ENSG00000120708	ENSMUSG00000035493
UniProt	Q15582	P82198
RefSeq (mRNA)	NM_000358	NM_009369
RefSeq (protein)	NP_000349	NP_033395
Location (UCSC)	Chr 5: 136.03 – 136.06 Mb	Chr 13: 56.76 – 56.79 Mb
PubMed search
- Wikidata
View/Edit Human	View/Edit Mouse

Transforming growth factor, beta-induced, 68kDa, also known as TGFBI (initially called BIGH3, BIG-H3), is a protein which in humans is encoded by the TGFBI gene, locus 5q31.

== Function ==
This gene encodes an RGD-containing protein that binds to type I, II and IV collagens. The RGD motif is found in many extracellular matrix proteins modulating cell adhesion and serves as a ligand recognition sequence for several integrins. This protein plays a role in cell-collagen interactions and may be involved in endochondral bone formation in cartilage. The protein is induced by transforming growth factor-beta and acts to inhibit cell adhesion.

== Clinical significance ==
Mutations of the gene cause several forms of corneal dystrophies.

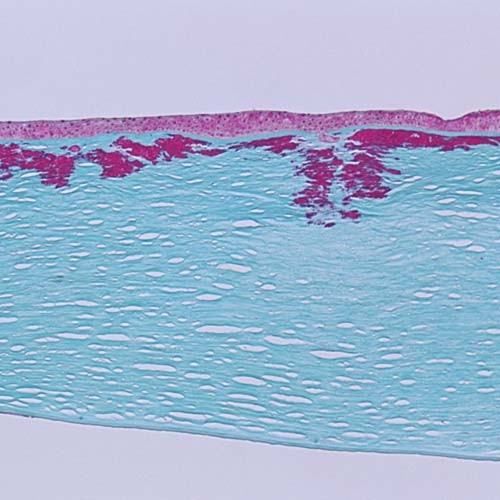
Reis-Bücklers corneal dystrophy. Light microscopy of cornea showing characteristic red stained deposits of mutated TGFBI protein in the superficial corneal stroma. Masson's trichrome stain.
