= Eye development =

Formation of the eye during embryonic development

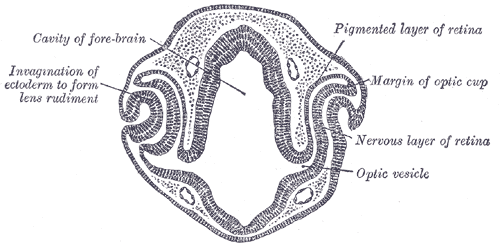
Transverse section of head of chick embryo of forty-eight hours’ incubation

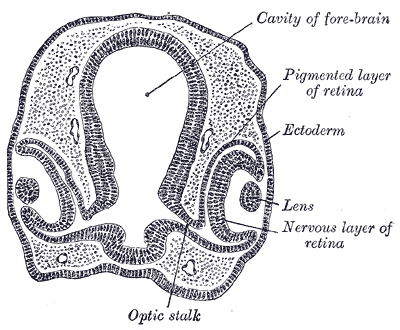
Transverse section of head of chick embryo of fifty-two hours’ incubation, showing the lens and the optic cup

Eye formation in the human embryo begins at approximately three weeks into embryonic development and continues through the tenth week. Cells from both the mesodermal and the ectodermal tissues contribute to the formation of the eye. Specifically, the eye is derived from the neuroepithelium, surface ectoderm, and the extracellular mesenchyme which consists of both the neural crest and mesoderm.

Neuroepithelium forms the retina, ciliary body, iris, and optic nerves. Surface ectoderm forms the lens, corneal epithelium and eyelid. The extracellular mesenchyme forms the sclera, the corneal endothelium and stroma, blood vessels, muscles, and vitreous.

The eye begins to develop as a pair of optic vesicles on each side of the forebrain at the end of the fourth week of pregnancy. Optic vesicles are outgrowings of the brain which make contact with the surface ectoderm and this contact induces changes necessary for further development of the eye. Through a groove at the bottom of the optic vesicle known as choroid fissure the blood vessels enter the eye. Several layers such as the neural tube, neural crest, surface ectoderm, and mesoderm contribute to the development of the eye.

Eye development is initiated by the master control gene PAX6, a homeobox gene with known homologues in humans (aniridia), mice (small eye), and Drosophila (eyeless). The PAX6 gene locus is a transcription factor for the various genes and growth factors involved in eye formation. Eye morphogenesis begins with the evagination, or outgrowth, of the optic grooves or sulci. These two grooves in the neural folds transform into optic vesicles with the closure of the neural tube. The optic vesicles then develop into the optic cup with the inner layer forming the retina and the outer portion forming the retinal pigment epithelium. The middle portion of the optic cup develops into the ciliary body and iris. During the invagination of the optic cup, the ectoderm begins to thicken and form the lens placode, which eventually separates from the ectoderm to form the lens vesicle at the open end of the optic cup.

Further differentiation and mechanical rearrangement of cells in and around the optic cup gives rise to the fully developed eye.

== Sequential inductions ==
This development is an example of sequential inductions where the organ is formed from three different tissues:

=== Neural tube ectoderm (neuroectoderm) ===
First, there is an outpocketing of the neural tube called optic vesicles. Development of the optic vesicles starts in the 3-week embryo, from a progressively deepening groove in the neural plate called the optic sulcus. Some studies suggest this mechanism is regulated by RX/RAX transcription factor. The proteins Wnt and FGF (fibroblast growth factor) play a part in this early stage and are regulated by another protein called Shisa. As this expands, the rostral neuropore (the exit of the brain cavity out of the embryo) closes and the optic sulcus and the neural plate becomes the optic vesicle. Optic nerves arise from connections of the vesicles to the forebrain.

Neuroectoderm gives rise to the following compartments of the eye:

- retina
- epithelial lining of ciliary body and iris
- optic nerves

=== Surface ectoderm ===
Lens development is closely related to optic vesicle development. The interaction between the growing vesicle and the ectoderm causes the ectoderm to thicken at that point. This thickened portion of the ectoderm is called the lens placode. Next, the placode invaginates and forms a pouch referred to as the lens pit. Scientists are studying the tension forces necessary for invagination of the lens placode and current research suggests that microfilaments might be present in early retinal cells to allow for invagination behavior. Research has also shown that Rho GTPase dependent filopodia from the precursor lens ectoderm play an important role in the formation of the lens pit. Eventually, the pit becomes completely enclosed. This enclosed structure is the lens vesicle. Studies have shown that lens development requires the presence of the Pax6 gene, which is the master regulatory gene for eye morphogenesis. This master regulatory gene is not necessary for the closely associated optic vesicle development. Additionally, Ras activation has been shown to be sufficient for starting lens differentiation, but not enough for its completion.

The optic vesicles then begin to form the optic cup. Optic cup morphogenesis is the invagination process occurring after neuroectoderm movement forms the spherical optic vesicle (Phase 1). Invagination is when a tissue folds back on itself. Over the course of approximately 12 hours, the distal end of the optic vesicle inner layer begins to flatten (Phase 2). Over the following 18 hours, both the inner and outer layers begin to flex inward at sharp angles, beginning the formation of a C-shaped edge (Phase 3). The final 18 hours involve continuing this apically convex invagination to form the optic cup . At this point, morphologies such as columnar epithelial cells, pseudo-stratified cells, and apically narrow wedge-shaped cells can be observed.

The inner layer of the optic cup is made of neuroepithelium (neural retina), while the outer layer is composed of retinal pigment epithelium (RPE). Experiments have determined that RPE cell differentiation and maintenance requires interaction with neighboring tissues, most likely canonical Wnt signaling, while neural retina differentiation is driven by tissue-autonomous factors.

Bone morphogenic proteins (BMPs) are important regulators of optic cup development. In fact, research studies have shown that BMP agonists and antagonists are necessary for precision of optic cup development. Interactions between tissues and signaling pathways also play a major role in morphogenesis of the optic cup.

It is of interest to note that research has shown isolating the optic cup from neighboring tissue after completed invagination in tissue culture medium can lead to the development of most major parts of the eye, including photoreceptors, ganglion cells, bipolar cells, horizontal cells, amacrine cells and Muller glia. This indicates that morphogenesis of the optic cup occurs independently of external cues from its environment, including presence of lens. However, the lens is necessary to act as an inducer for the ectoderm to transform it into the cornea.

Surface ectoderm produces the following parts:

- lens
- corneal epithelium
- skin of eyelid

=== Neural crest ===
Neural crest cells are themselves derived from the ectoderm and lie close to the neural tube:

- sclera
- Cornea: Descemet's membrane and endothelium
- connective tissue and bony structure of the orbit

=== Mesoderm ===
Mesoderm contributes to the following structures:

- extraocular muscles
- endothelial lining of blood vessels of the eye
- blood vessels in sclera & choroid
- Sclera & Choroid
- Vitreous
- Suspensory fibres
- Cornea: Bowman's membrane and stroma

== Developmental cascade ==
According to Liem et al., the organogenesis of the eye is pointed out as an example of a developmental cascade of inductions. The eye is essentially a derivative of the ectoderm from the somatic ectoderm and neural tube, with a succession of inductions by the chordamesoderm.

Chordamesoderm induces the anterior portion of the neural tube to form the precursors of the synapomorphic tripartite brain of vertebrates, and it will form a bulge called the diencephalon. Further induction by the chordamesoderm will form a protrusion: the optic vesicle. This vesicle will be subsequently invaginated by means of further inductions from the chordamesoderm. The optic vesicle will then induce the ectoderm that thickens (lens placode) and further invaginates to a point that detaches from the ectoderm and forms a neurogenic placode by itself. The lens placode is affected by the chordamesoderm making it invaginate and forms the optic cup composed by an inner layer of the neural retina and outer layer of the pigmented retina that will unite and form the optic stalk. The pigmented retina is formed by rods and cones and composed of small cilia typical of the ependymal epithelium of the neural tube. Some cells in the lens vesicle will be fated to form the cornea and the lens vesicle will develop completely to form the definitive lens. Iris is formed from the optic cup cells.

== Responsivity of head epidermis ==
Only the epidermis in the head is competent to respond to the signal from the optic vesicles. Both the optic vesicle and the head epidermis are required for eye development. The competence of the head epidermis to respond to the optic vesicle signals comes from the expression of Pax6 in the epidermis. Pax6 is necessary and sufficient for eye induction. This competence is acquired gradually during gastrulation and neurulation from interactions with the endoderm, mesoderm, and neural plate.

== Regulation and inhibition ==
Sonic hedgehog reduces the expression of Pax6. When Shh is inhibited during development, the domain of expression for Pax6 is expanded and the eyes fail to separate causing cyclopia. Overexpression of Shh causes a loss of eye structures.

Retinoic acid generated from vitamin A in the retina plays an essential role in eye development as a secreted paracrine signal which restricts invasion of perioptic mesenchyme around the optic cup. Vitamin A deficiency during embryogenesis results in anterior segment defects (particularly cornea and eyelids) that lead to vision loss or blindness.

There is some evidence that LMX1B plays a role in periocular mesenchymal survival.

== Additional images ==
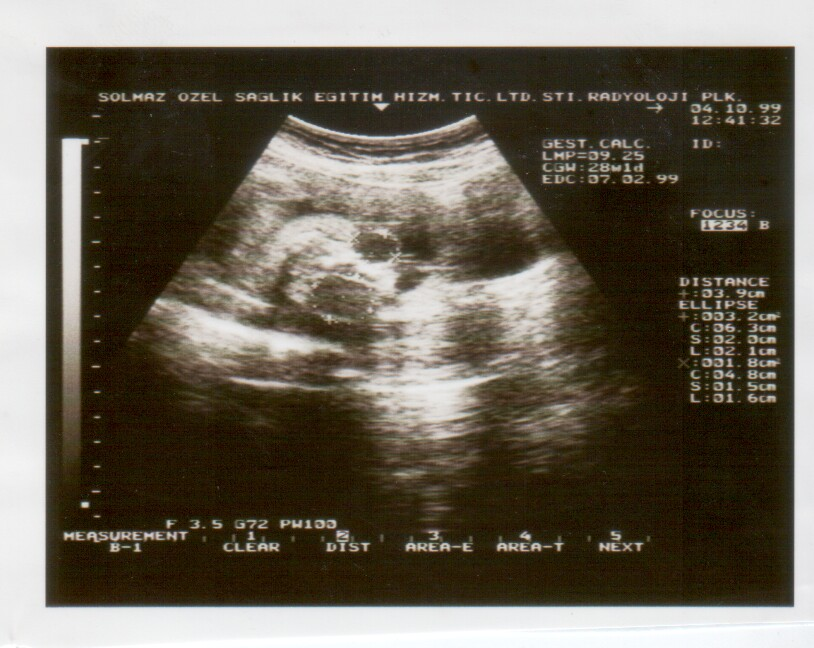

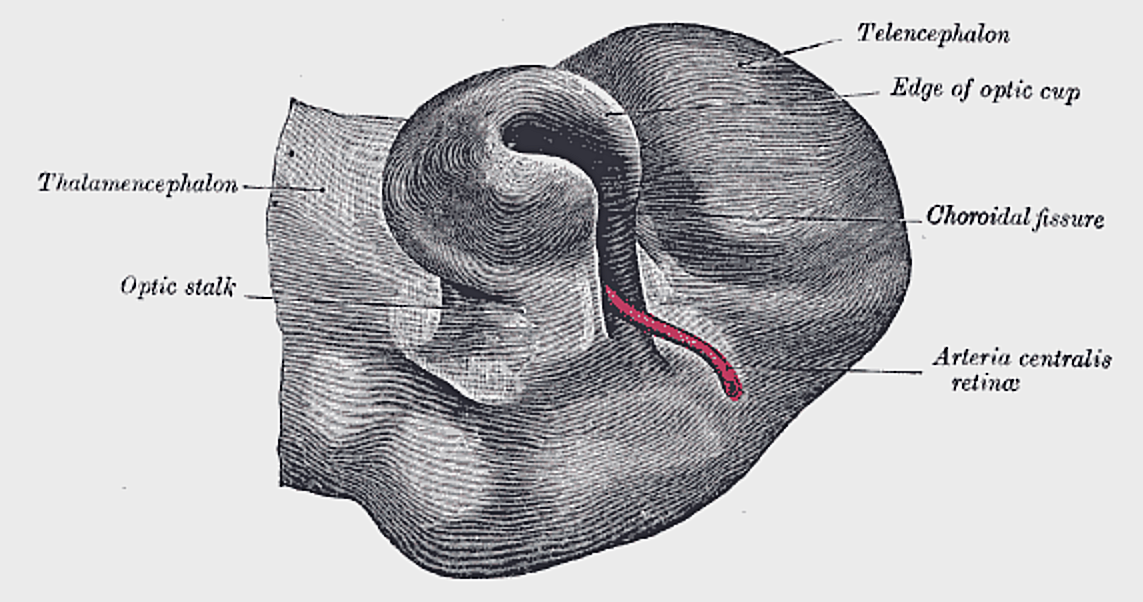
Optic cup and choroidal fissure seen from below, from a human embryo of about four weeks.

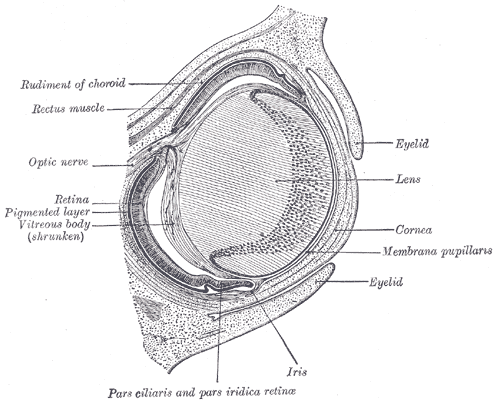
Horizontal section through the eye of an eighteen days’ embryo rabbit. X 30.

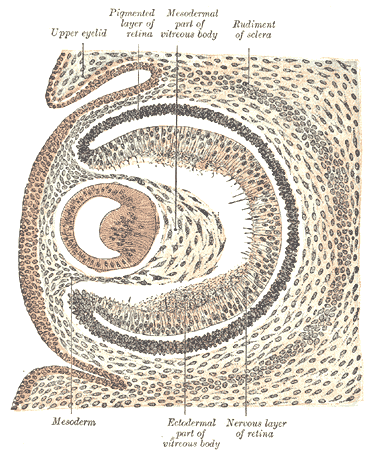
Sagittal section of eye of human embryo of six weeks.

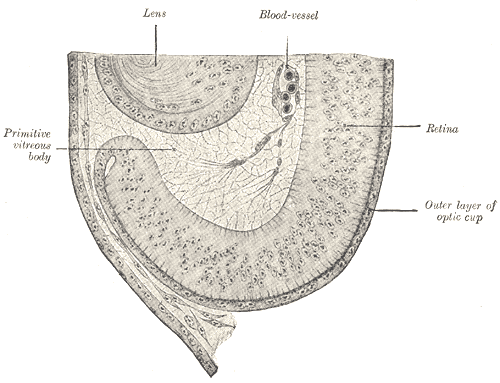
Section of developing eye of trout.
