= Corneal ulcers in animals =

Veterinary inflammatory condition of the cornea

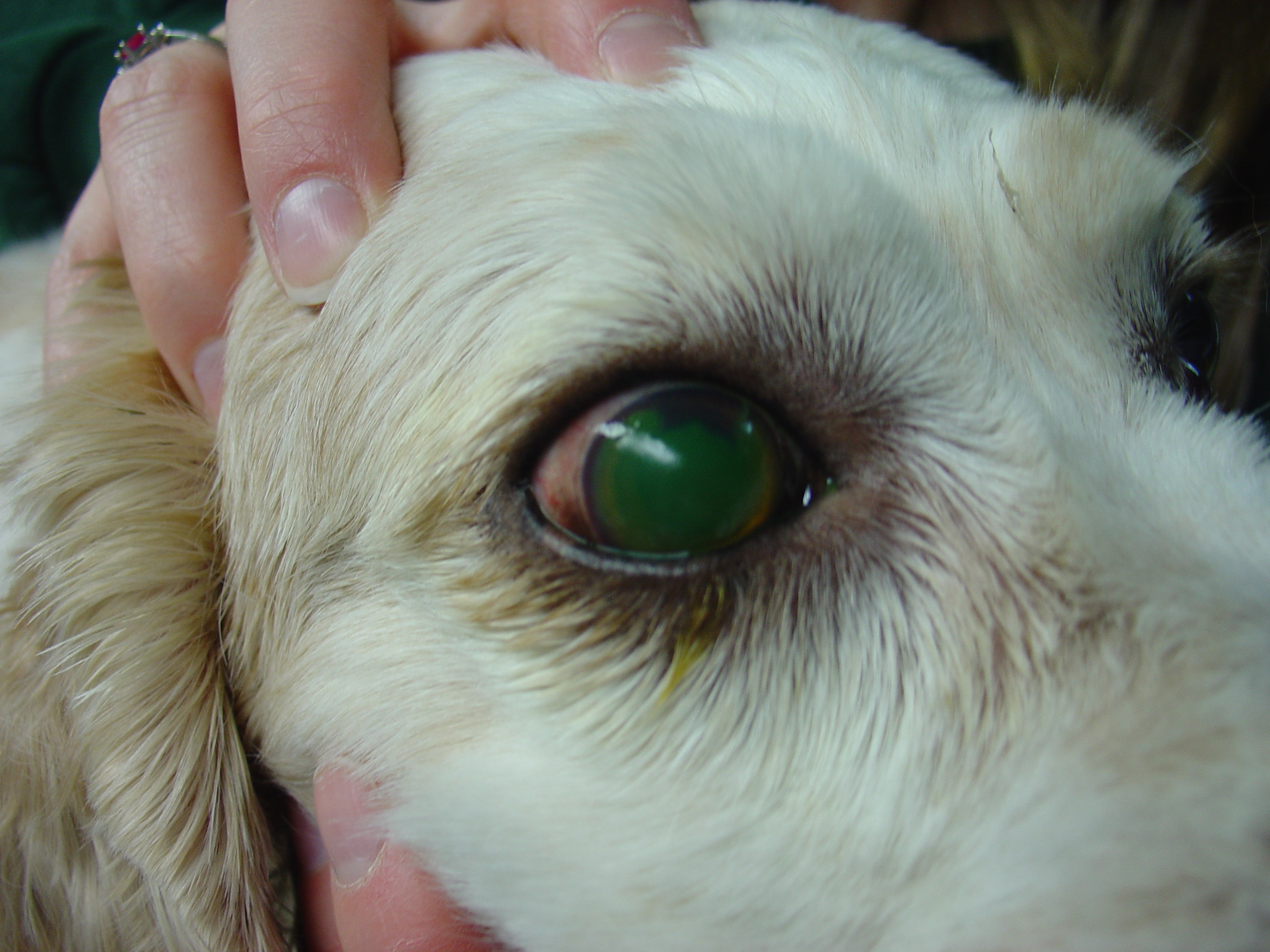
Large corneal ulcer in a dog

A corneal ulcer, or ulcerative keratitis, is an inflammatory condition of the cornea involving loss of its outer layer. It is very common in dogs and is sometimes seen in cats. In veterinary medicine, the term corneal ulcer is a generic name for any condition involving the loss of the outer layer of the cornea, and as such is used to describe conditions with both inflammatory and traumatic causes.

== Corneal anatomy of the dog and cat ==
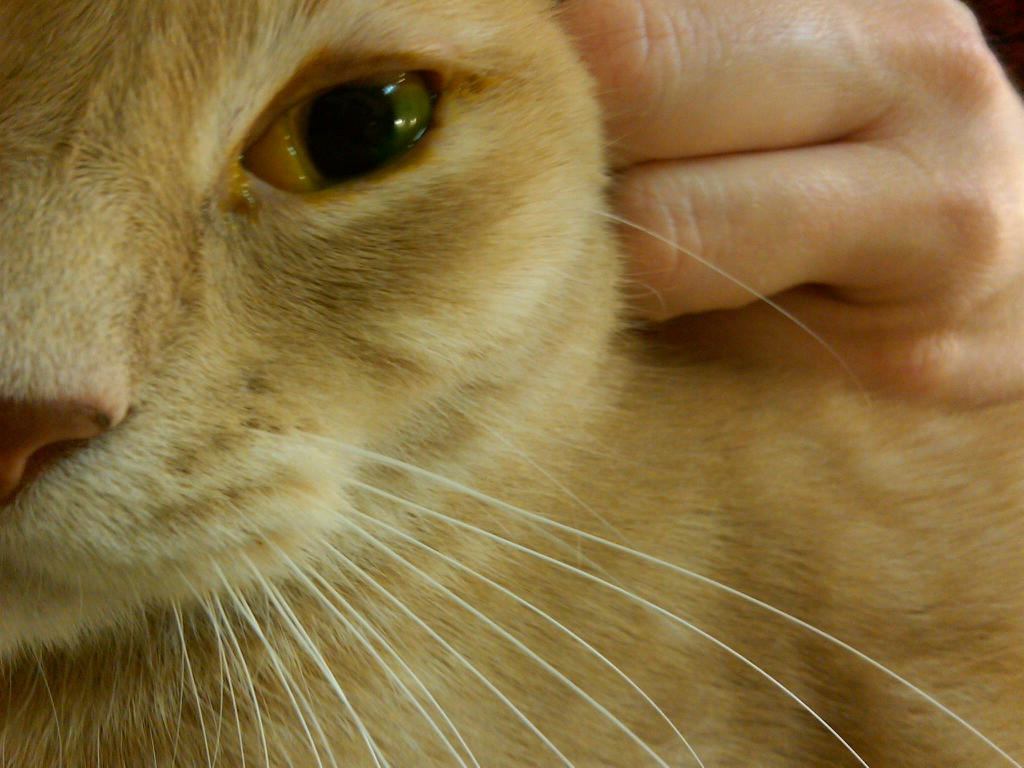
A corneal ulcer in a cat

The cornea is a transparent structure that is part of the outer layer of the eye. It refracts light and protects the contents of the eye. The cornea is about one-half to one millimeter thick in the dog and cat. The trigeminal nerve supplies the cornea via the long ciliary nerves. There are pain receptors in the outer layers and pressure receptors deeper.

Transparency is achieved through a lack of blood vessels, pigmentation, and keratin, and through the organization of the collagen fibers. The collagen fibers cross the full diameter of the cornea in a strictly parallel fashion and allow 99 percent of the light to pass through without scattering.

There are four important layers in the dog and cat cornea. The outer layer is the epithelium, which is 25 to 40 micrometers and five to seven cell layers thick. The epithelium holds the tear film in place and also prevents water from invading the cornea and disrupting the collagen fibers. This prevents corneal edema, which gives it a cloudy appearance. It is also a barrier to infectious agents. The epithelium sticks to the basement membrane, which also separates the epithelium from the stroma. The corneal stroma comprises 90 percent of the thickness of the cornea. It contains the collagen fibers organized into lamellae. The lamellae are in sheets which separate easily. Posterior to the stroma is Descemet's membrane, which is a basement membrane for the corneal endothelium. The endothelium is a single cell layer that separates the cornea from the aqueous humor.

== Corneal healing ==
A healing of a corneal ulcer involves two processes: migration of surrounding epithelial cells followed by mitosis (dividing) of the cells, and introduction of blood vessels from the conjunctiva. Superficial small ulcers heal rapidly by the first process. However, larger or deeper ulcers often require the presence of blood vessels to supply inflammatory cells. White blood cells and fibroblasts produce granulation tissue and then scar tissue, effectively healing the cornea.

== Superficial and deep corneal ulcers ==
Corneal ulcers are one of the most common eye diseases in dogs. They are caused by trauma, detergent burns, and infections. Other eye conditions can cause corneal ulcers, such as entropion, distichiae, corneal dystrophy, and keratoconjunctivitis sicca (dry eye). There have been at least two cases where corneal ulceration was caused by canine herpesvirus.

Superficial ulcers involve a loss of part of the epithelium. Deep ulcers extend into or through the stroma and can result in severe scarring and corneal perforation. Descemetoceles occur when the ulcer extends through the stroma, exposing Descemet's membrane. This type of ulcer is especially dangerous and can result in perforation.

The location of the ulcer depends somewhat on the cause. Central ulcers are typically caused by trauma, dry eye, or exposure from facial nerve paralysis or exophthalmos. Ulcers in the inferior nasal cornea may be caused by foreign material trapped under the third eyelid. Entropion or distichiae may cause ulceration of the peripheral cornea. Immune-mediated eye disease can cause ulcers at the border of the cornea and sclera.

=== Symptoms ===
Corneal ulcers are painful due to nerve exposure, and can cause tearing, squinting, and pawing at the eye. There may also be signs of anterior uveitis, such as miosis (small pupil), aqueous flare (protein in the aqueous humour), and redness of the eye. An axon reflex may be responsible for uveitis formation — stimulation of pain receptors in the cornea results in release inflammatory mediators such as prostaglandins, histamine, and acetylcholine.

=== Diagnosis ===
Diagnosis is through direct observation of the ulcer with the use of fluorescein stain, which is taken up by exposed corneal stroma and appears green (see photos above and below). With descemetoceles, Descemet's membrane will bulge forward and after staining will appear as a dark circle with a green boundary, because it does not absorb the stain. Other tests that may be necessary include a Schirmer's test for keratoconjunctivitis sicca and an analysis of facial nerve function for facial nerve paralysis.

=== Treatment ===
Treatment of corneal ulcers includes topical antibiotic therapy to prevent infection, and pain medications, including topical atropine to stop spasms of the ciliary muscle. Atropine may decrease tear production and interfere with corneal healing. Superficial ulcers usually heal in less than a week. Deep ulcers and descemetoceles may require corneal suturing, conjunctival grafts or conjunctival flaps, soft contact lenses, or corneal transplant. Topical corticosteroids and anesthetics should not be used on any type of corneal ulcer because they prevent healing and will often make them worse.

==== Bioscaffold ====
A new bioscaffold developed by TR BioSurgical is being evaluated for refractory corneal ulcers in dogs. The study is being conducted by board certified veterinary ophthalmologists and has shown promise in healing refractory ulcers that have failed conventional treatment .

== Refractory corneal ulcers ==
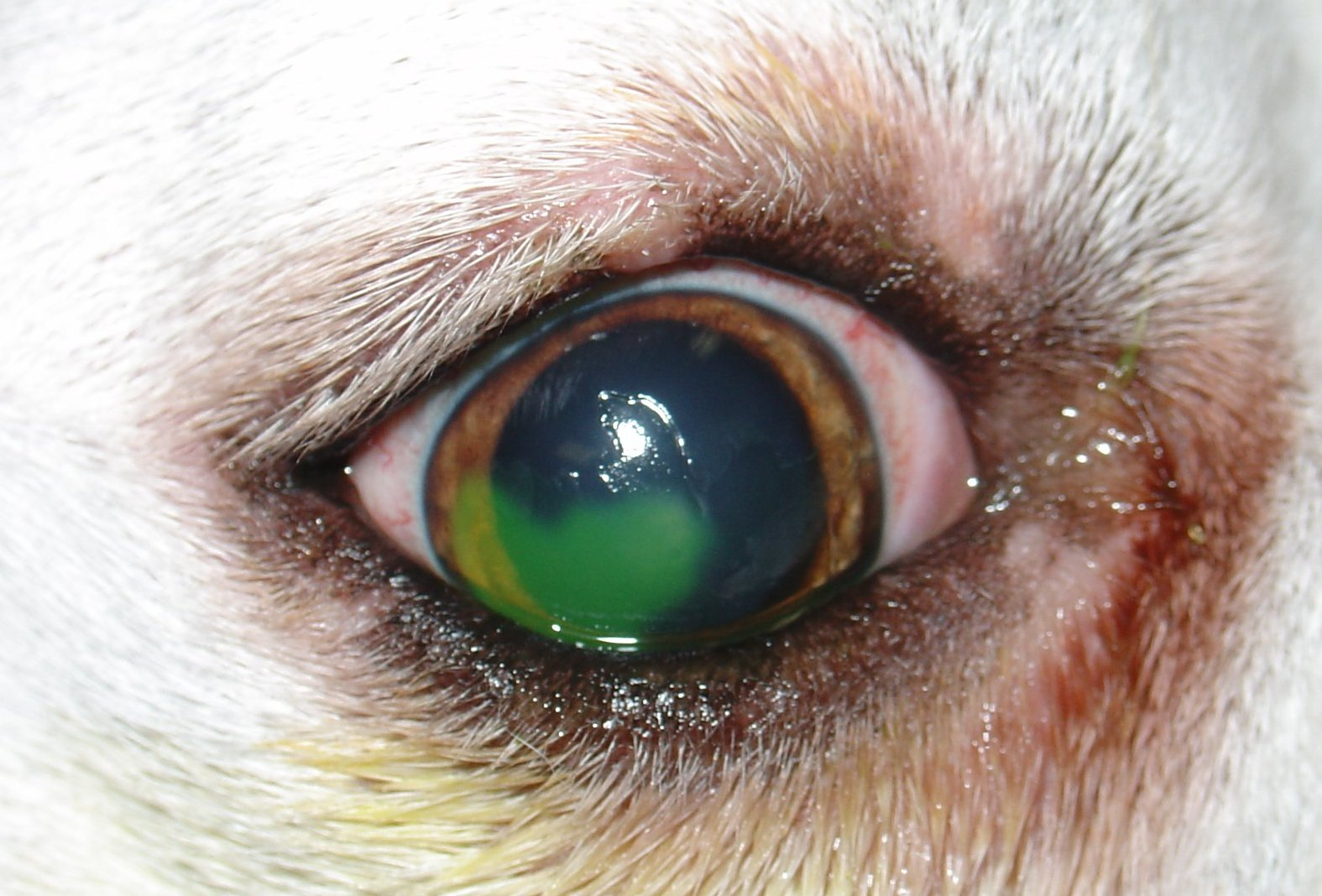
Refractory corneal ulcer

Refractory corneal ulcers are superficial ulcers that heal poorly and tend to recur. They are also known as indolent ulcers or Boxer ulcers. They are believed to be caused by a defect in the basement membrane and a lack of hemidesmosomal attachments. They are recognized by undermined epithelium that surrounds the ulcer and easily peels back. Refractory corneal ulcers are most commonly seen in middle aged or older dogs and often occur in the other eye later. They are similar to Cogan's cystic dystrophy in humans.

=== Commonly affected breeds ===
- Alaskan Malamute
- American Cocker Spaniel
- Boston Terrier
- Boxer
- Brussels Griffon
- Cairn Terrier
- Chesapeake Bay Retriever
- Chihuahua
- Chinese Shar Pei
- Dachshund
- Bulldog
- English Springer Spaniel
- German Shepherd Dog
- Golden Retriever
- Irish Setter
- Japanese Chin
- Lhasa Apso
- Maltese
- Pekingese
- Poodle
- Pug
- Rottweiler
- Samoyed
- Shih Tzu
- Silky Terrier
- Weimaraner
- Welsh Corgi
- Welsh Springer Spaniel
- West Highland White Terrier
- Wirehaired Fox Terrier

=== Treatment ===
Refractory corneal ulcers can take a long time to heal, sometimes months. Topical antibiotics are used continually to prevent infection. Pain medications are given as needed. Loose epithelium is removed with a dry cotton swab under topical anesthesia. This is in order to allow production of normal basement membrane and division of normal epithelium. Often further treatment is necessary, such as a keratotomy, which is superficial cutting or piercing of the cornea. There are two main types used in dogs: multiple punctate keratotomy (MPK) and grid keratotomy (GK). MPK involves making small superficial punctures into the cornea with a needle. GK is more commonly used and involves making parallel and perpendicular scratches in the corneal surface. Usually only topical anesthesia is necessary. By scoring the corneal surface, anchoring points are provided for attachment of new epithelium. Of course, these procedures should only be performed by a veterinarian, particularly one with some experience in this treatment. Complete healing takes about three to four weeks. Keratotomies may lead to corneal sequestration in cats. Other medications have been shown to be useful in topical treatment of refractory ulcers, including glycosaminoglycans such as sodium hyaluronate and chondroitin sulfate, aminocaproic acid, and acetylcysteine.

== Melting ulcers ==
Melting ulcers are a type of corneal ulcer involving progressive loss of stroma in a dissolving fashion. This is most commonly seen in Pseudomonas infection, but it can be caused by other types of bacteria or fungi. These infectious agents produce proteases and collagenases which break down the corneal stroma. Complete loss of the stroma can occur within 24 hours. Treatment includes antibiotics and collagenase inhibitors such as acetylcysteine and homologous blood serum. Surgery may be necessary.

== Corneal ulcers in cats ==
Corneal ulcers in cats can be caused by trauma, detergent burns, infections, and other eye diseases. One common cause not seen in dogs is infection with feline herpesvirus 1 (FHV-1). FHV-1 causes ulceration by direct infection of the epithelial cells. Lesions appear as round or dendritic (branching) ulcers. FHV-1 also suppresses healing of the cornea. Symptoms include conjunctivitis, squinting, eye discharge, and blood vessels on the cornea. It can cause severe scarring. Treatment is with topical antiviral drugs and antibiotics, and oral L-lysine, which competes with arginine and inhibits viral replication.

== Corneal ulcers in horses ==
Corneal ulceration is a very common disease of the equine eye and can have sight-threatening consequences. Aggressive treatment is always indicated, as even apparently mild ulcers can progress quickly, causing serious complications.

=== Causes ===
A distinct cause for initial ulceration is not commonly found, although in many cases it can be assumed to be traumatic in origin. The horse's eye is especially vulnerable to trauma due to its prominent position, compared with other species. Exposure keratitis (inflamed cornea) can occur in the horse, most commonly secondary to facial nerve paralysis. Hospitalised animals have been shown to have a decreased corneal reflex, and this corresponds to an increased incidence of ulcers in the hospitalised population. Foreign bodies embedded in the palpebral conjunctiva or the nictitating membrane can cause persistent irritation and ulceration. Often the shape and distribution of the lesion is suggestive of this aetiology, but even in the absence of a characteristic lesion their presence should be considered and sought out.

Bacterial and fungal infection occurs readily after the initial ulceration, as disruption of the corneal epithelium allows attachment and colonisation of the underlying tissues by normal corneal commensals. Commonly isolated bacteria include Staphylococcus, Streptococcus and Pseudomonas, and empirical anti-microbial therapy should be effective against these bacteria.

=== Symptoms ===
- Ocular Pain
  - Blepharospasm
  - Increased lacrimation
  - Photophobia
- Corneal Oedema (1⁰/2⁰)
- Scleral injection
- Conjunctivitis

=== Diagnosis ===
Differential diagnoses for the painful equine eye:

- Ulceration
- Uveitis
- Blepharitis
- Conjunctivitis
- Glaucoma
- Dachrocystitis

A full ocular exam should be performed for every case of eye pain. Fluoroscein staining is usually diagnostic for corneal ulcers, although staining with Rose Bengal is also recommended as it can pick up early viral/fungal lesions, which will appear as multifocal disturbances to the tear film.

Culture and sensitivity is recommended for rapidly progressive or deep corneal ulcers. Cotton swabbing is often inadequate, and corneal scraping, for example, with the blunt side of a scalpel blade is usually required. This can be greatly facilitated by the use of local nerve blocks and topical anaesthesia.

There is almost invariably a secondary uveitis present with corneal ulceration, and signs of this may also be seen: miosis, corneal oedema, aqueous flare, hypopyon, IOP changes.

=== Treatment ===
Medical therapy should be based upon the severity of disease initially, and then by the response to therapy. The aims of the initial therapy are:

- Antibiosis
- Analgesia
- Anti-inflammatory
- Mydriatic

The initial choice of antibiotic depends upon personal choice, experience and availability, but could include chloramphenicol, chlortetracycline, bacitracin-neomycin-polymyxin (BNP), ciprofloxacin, ofloxacin and tobramycin. Topical gentamicin formulations are also available, but in the opinion of some, should be reserved for cases with stromal melting. Frequency of application can vary from q1h to q8h, depending on both the severity of the lesion, and the formulation used (ointment vs. drops).

Much of the pain associated with corneal ulceration is due to the secondary uveitis and miosis, and effective relief can often be gained with topical atropine(1%), leading to mydriasis. Dosing is generally q4h initially, and then as required to maintain dilation. Mydriasis is also important to avoid some of the complications associated with uveitis, such as synechiae formation and glaucoma. Pain is also associated with inflammatory response occurring in the adjacent sclera and conjunctiva, and systemic analgesia in the form of NSAIDs is usually indicated, for example, flunixin meglumin 1.1 mg/kg, BID. Topical NSAIDs are available (diclofenac, flurbiprofen) and effective, but have been shown to increase corneal healing time.

In horses that are difficult to treat, or in cases that require very frequent treatment, then placement of a sub-palpebral lavage system can be very useful. As an adjunct to therapy, physical protection of the eye may be required, in the form of a mask. Some horses will rub their eyes in response to pain, and this can cause further corneal damage. Box rest is also vital, as over-exertion has been linked to intra-ocular haemorrhage and increased severity of uveitis.

Success in your therapeutic regime can be judged by a reduction in pain, and a decrease in size of the ulcer. Healing generally occurs rapidly at first, followed by a slowing after 5–7 days. As a rough guide, a non-infected ulcer can be expected to heal at approximately 0.6mm/day.

=== Complications ===
In cases where the ulcer is not healing:

- Is there a persistent source of irritation?
  - Foreign body
  - Self traumatisation
  - Iatrogenic.
- Is it infected?
  - Review antibiotic therapy
  - C+S if not already performed.
- Immunosuppression?
  - Cushing's
  - Steroid therapy.
- Compliance?
  - Is what you've prescribed getting onto the eye?
- None of the above?
  - Abnormal epithelium may have formed, keratectomy may be appropriate.

Melting ulcers reflect inappropriate collagenolysis of the corneal stroma, by matrix-metalloproteinases (MMPs). Bacterial pathogens (especially Pseudomonas and β-haemolytic Streptococcus) induce the corneal epithelial cells and resident leucocytes to upregulate pro-inflammatory, and MMP-activating cytokines (IL-1,-6 and -8). These bacteria can also produce their own proteinases. The combination of exogenous, and upregulated endogenous, proteinases leads to a rapid breakdown of collagen, with the characteristic melting appearance. Untreated this can lead to perforation within 12 hours (so act hard and fast!). There are several therapeutic options for inhibiting MMPs:

- Autogenous serum – administer topically as often as possible. Keep refrigerated and change every 8 days.
- EDTA - 0.05% q1h
- Acetylcysteine – 5-10% q1h
- Tetracyclines – Doxycycline especially has been shown to have anti-MMP effects
- Tetanus antitoxin – can be delivered sub-conjunctivally. Contains macroglobulins with anti-collagenase effects.

A combination of the above may be necessary early in the disease course. Effective antibiosis is also paramount, and gentamicin is a good empirical choice (although there are some reports of gentamicin-resistant Pseudomonas species). Obviously, treating an eye this frequently in practice will be difficult, so referral is probably the best option.

== See also ==
- Corneal abrasion
- Keratitis
