= Dua's layer =

Fourth layer of cornea( first being the outermost and sixth being the innermost)

Dua's layer, according to a 2013 paper by Harminder Singh Dua's group at the University of Nottingham, is a layer of the cornea that had not been detected previously. It is hypothetically 15 micrometres (0.59 mils) thick, the fourth caudal layer, and located between the corneal stroma and Descemet's membrane. Despite its thinness, the layer is very strong and impervious to air. It is strong enough to withstand up to 2 bars (200 kPa) of pressure. While some scientists welcomed the announcement, other scientists cautioned that time was needed for other researchers to confirm the discovery and its significance. Others have met the claim "with incredulity".

Schematic illustration of posterior corneal separation patterns. (A) In Type-1 separation, Dua's layer (black arrow) remains adherent to Descemet's membrane (white arrow), and both layers detach together from the posterior stroma as a thick, compact, taut unit. (B) In Type-2 separation, only Descemet's membrane (white arrow) detaches from the posterior stroma, while Dua's layer (black arrow) remains adherent to the stroma, resulting in a thinner and more fragile configuration.

== Study ==
In a paper published in 2013, the existence of a new layer was suggested by Harminder Singh Dua et al. Dua's team from the University of Nottingham are conducting transplant-related research on donated eyes. Simulating corneal surgery, they injected tiny bubbles of air into the cornea. Descemet's membrane was surgically removed, causing the air bubble to dissipate in some specimens ("type II bubbles"), but not others ("type I bubbles"). Further experimentation revealed that all air-bubble-free specimens could be re-inflated with a type I bubble. After the bubble was inflated to the point of popping, no further bubble could be formed from further injection, indicating that the bubble was being trapped by a distinct layer of material, not a random variation in the corneal stroma.

The experimental results were studied by optical and electron microscopy. The images showed a thin layer of corneal collagen between the corneal stroma and Descemet's membrane. The findings were published in Ophthalmology in May 2013. The paper named the layer after the lead author, Harminder Dua. A press release reported Dua as saying that the discovery meant "ophthalmology textbooks will literally need to be re-written." In a later interview, he offered a more detailed explanation, disclaiming the "rewritten textbooks" of the press release.

== Clinical applications ==
The authors of the paper believe that it may have important medical implications. The layer may help surgeons improve outcomes for patients undergoing corneal grafts and transplants. During surgery, tiny air bubbles are injected into the corneal stroma in what is known as the "big bubble technique". Sometimes the bubble bursts, damaging the patient's eye. If the air bubble is injected under Dua's layer instead of above it, the layer's strength could reduce the risk of tearing.

The understanding of diseases of the cornea, including acute hydrops, Descemetocele, and pre-Descemet's dystrophies, may be affected if the existence of this layer is confirmed. Harminder Dua believes that from a clinical perspective, there are many diseases that affect the back of the cornea, which clinicians across the world are beginning to relate to the presence, absence, or tear in this layer.

Corneal hydrops, a buildup of fluid in the cornea that is common in patients with keratoconus (a conical deformity of the cornea) might be caused by a tear in Dua's layer. Dua hypothesizes that such a tear would allow water from inside the eye to pass through and cause fluid buildup.

The discovery of this layer has led to description of three new surgical techniques: pre-Descemet's endothelial keratoplasty (PDEK), DALK triple (DALK with phacoemulsification with implant) and compression suturing of Dua's layer in acute hydrops.

== Reaction ==
By August 2013, reaction to the news in the medical world ranged from welcoming to skeptical, and there was "not as yet global academic support for a textbook change". Mark Terry, clinical ophthalmology professor at Oregon Health & Science University stated:

"I applaud the fresh approach to corneal anatomy that Dr. Dua has taken, and I look forward to further documentation of the unique benefits of this layer in treatment.”

But Peter McDonnell, the director of the Johns Hopkins Wilmer Eye Institute and chief medical editor of the Ophthalmology Times, said that time was needed “to see if others can confirm the existence of this ‘new layer’ and its potential significance", and added that his own reading of Dua's paper was that "this is not a description of a new layer in the sense of how we think of the corneal layers".

In October 2013, Roger Steinert, the director of the Gavin Herbert Eye Institute and ophthalmology chair at the University of California, Irvine, both described the new layer as a "purported discovery" and criticized the choice of name for the layer.

In February 2014, McKee et al criticized the validity of the discovery, as well as the self-chosen name Dua's Layer:

"We read the recent claim of the discovery of a new corneal layer by Dua et al with incredulity. The existence of pre-Descemet stromal tissue remaining after pneumodissection is well known. Their further investigation of this pre-Descemet stroma confirms that it is stroma, and not a new corneal layer...[D]espite current trends to avoid medical eponyms", if such a medical eponym was desired then '‘the Feizi stroma’ would be more appropriate."

Dua et al. responded that the first public presentation of the concept and evidence of a new corneal layer was introduced by Dua HS at two international meetings, UK and Italy, where images of the big bubble and of transmission electron microscopy showing the layer dating from 2005 were demonstrated and that the use of the term was regretted and with hindsight was probably not a good choice. Ever since numerous publications and textbooks have appeared in the literature using the term "Dua's Layer". There are over 200 citations to the original paper on this new layer, which was published in 2013.

In 2014, Professor Harminder Dua and his research team received the Times Higher Education Award 2014 for ‘Research project of the year for this discovery. The Times Higher Education Awards judges described the discovery as truly ground-breaking.
