= Mooren's ulcer =

Idiopathic ocular disorder

Mooren's ulcer is a rare idiopathic ocular disorder that may lead to blindness due to progressive destruction of the peripheral cornea. Although the etiology of Mooren's ulcer is poorly understood, recent evidence suggests that the pathogenesis of this disease appears to be the result of an autoimmune process directed against molecules expressed in the corneal stroma.

Mooren's ulcer is also defined as a special and the most common type of peripheral ulcerative keratitis (PUK).

== Signs and symptoms ==
Symptoms of Mooren's ulcer can include:

- Pain in the affected eye(s)
- Redness of the affected eye(s)
- Progressive ulceration of the cornea
- Blurred vision
- Photophobia
- Tearing

Some epidemiological studies have noted that men tend to be affected more than women.

== Classification ==
The most commonly used classification was proposed by Watson in 1997. He divided the disease into three types based on the clinical picture:

- Unilateral Mooren's ulceration is characterized by extremely painful progressive ulceration of the cornea in one eye. This form is more common in elderly patients.
- Bilateral aggressive Mooren's ulceration which is observed more often in young patients and progresses along the entire circumference, then captures the central area of the cornea.
- Bilateral indolent Mooren's ulceration (BIM) usually occurs in middle-aged patients and manifested by a progressive peripheral corneal guttering in both eyes.

== Risk factors ==
Several risk factors affecting the development of Mooren's ulcer have been suggested.

=== Corneal trauma ===
Previous ocular trauma or infection can cause disruption of the corneal integrity resulting in the expression of tissue-specific antigens that are normally hidden from the immune system. It may lead to an increased risk of a sensitization to corneal antigens and an autoimmune reaction against antigens expressed in corneal tissues.

=== HLA association ===
Like most autoimmune diseases, Mooren's ulcer is thought to be associated with specific HLA haplotypes. In some studies, HLA-DR17 and HLA-DQ2 have been found in increased frequencies in affected patients compared to healthy controls. These results propose a possible association between HLA and Mooren's ulcer.

== Pathology ==
The precise pathophysiological mechanism of Mooren's ulcer remains unclear, but most data suggest that both cell-mediated immunity and humoral immunity are involved in the pathogenesis of the disease.

Reduces numbers of suppressor T cells have been found in peripheral blood from patients with Mooren's ulcer. This deficit in systematic immunoregulatory mechanism may lead to loss of a control over autoreactive T and B cells and contributes to disease pathogenesis.

Immunohistochemical studies in patients suffered from Mooren's ulcer showed massive infiltration of multiple types of inflammatory cells in the conjunctival tissue.

The cell types in the inflammatory lesion includes CD4+ and CD8+ T-lymphocytes, B-lymphocytes, macrophages, a small amount of neutrophils was also observed in the conjunctiva from patients with Mooren's ulcer.

In addition, circulating IgG antibodies with specificity for corneal and conjunctival antigens have been isolated from patients with Mooren's ulcer. Gottsch and colleagues have suggested that calgranulin C, a protein expressed in the corneal stroma, may be a possible main target for autoimmune response causing Mooren's ulcer.

Also, significantly increased expression levels of adhesion and co-stimulatory molecules have been found in ocular tissues affected by Mooren's ulcer compared to healthy eyes. Upregulation of adhesion molecules allows leukocyte migration into inflamed tissues. Co-stimulatory molecules may contribute to sustained local immune activation. Therefore, blockage of these molecules is supposed to be a protentional therapeutic strategy for suppressing the inflammatory progression.

Elevated levels of proteases and collagenases which damage the corneal stroma have also been found in affected conjunctival tissues.

== Diagnosis ==
In view of rarity and limited knowledge of the etiology of Mooren's ulcer, the diagnosis of the disease is complicated. The absence of any systematic disorders which can lead to peripheral corneal ulceration supports the diagnosis of Mooren's ulcer. To diagnose Mooren's ulcer, it is necessary to rule out other forms of non-infectious peripheral ulcerative keratitis.

== Treatment ==
=== Medical treatment ===
Topical corticosteroids are usually used as first line of therapy. Severe cases require administration of systemic immunosuppressive agents. The more commonly used drugs are cyclosporine A, methotrexate and cyclophosphamide.

Several case reports showed that biological agents, such as anti-tumor necrosis factor alpha (anti-TNF) or monoclonal antibodies against CD20, also can be used as an effective treatment of progressive Mooren's ulceration.

=== Surgical treatment ===
If patients do not respond to medication, surgical intervention must be performed. Conjunctival excision has been shown to be an effective method. The principle of this surgery is based on the removal of unhealthy limbal conjunctiva adjacent to the ulcer. slow down the disease progression due to eliminating the local source of inflammatory cells, mediators and enzymes which cause the tissue damage.

Another surgical treatment option which has been successfully used as a treatment for Mooren's ulcer is Amniotic Membrane Transplantation (AMT). This method consists of applying a piece of amniotic membrane to the ocular surface. Amniotic membrane patches are prepared from placental tissues from women who had a planned cesarean sections. AMT appears to be a useful therapy which results with stabilization of the ulcer progression and corneal epithelial defect healing. It is most likely, that amniotic membrane used as an ocular graft stop the inflammation process because of the expression of immunoregulatory molecules, including Fas ligand and HLA–G antigens. In addition, the amniotic membrane contains a large number of collagens, growth factors and protease inhibitors which can promote healing and reconstruction of the conjunctival epithelium.

Other surgical interventions such as lamellar keratectomy, keratoepithelioplasty and corneal transplantation have also been reported as effective treatment options for Mooren's ulcer.
