= Anterior segment mesenchymal dysgenesis =

- Other names: Anterior segment dysgenesis
- Anterior segment mesenchymal dysgenesis is inherited in an autosomal dominant manner.
- Specialty: Medical genetics

Anterior segment mesenchymal dysgenesis, or simply anterior segment dysgenesis, is a failure of the normal development of the tissues of the anterior segment of the eye. It leads to anomalies in the structure of the mature anterior segment, associated with an increased risk of glaucoma and corneal opacity.

Peters' (frequently misspelled as Peter's) anomaly is a specific type of mesenchymal anterior segment dysgenesis, in which there is central corneal leukoma, adhesions of the iris and cornea and abnormalities of the posterior corneal stroma, Descemet's membrane, corneal endothelium, lens and anterior chamber.

== Pathophysiology ==
Several gene mutations have been identified underlying these anomalies, with the majority of anterior segment dysgenesis genes encoding transcriptional regulators. In this review, the role of the anterior segment dysgenesis genes PITX2 and FOXC1 is considered in relation to the embryology of the anterior segment, the biochemical function of these proteins, and their role in development and disease aetiology. The emerging view is that these genes act in concert to specify a population of mesenchymal progenitor cells, mainly of neural crest origin, as they migrate anteriorly around the embryonic optic cup. These same genes then regulate mesenchymal cell differentiation to give rise to distinct anterior segment tissues. Development appears critically sensitive to gene dosage, and variation in the normal level of transcription factor activity causes a range of anterior segment anomalies. Interplay between PITX2 and FOXC1 in the development of different anterior segment tissues may partly explain the phenotypic variability and the genetic heterogeneity characteristic of anterior segment dysgenesis. In the most recent research, the PAX6 gene has been implicated in Peters' Anomaly.

== Management ==
There is no standard treatment approval, yet numerous surgical techniques have been tried during the latest years, including: penetrating keratoplasty, cataract aspiration or lensectomy, optical iridectomy, selective endothelial removal, trabeculectomy and implant of glaucoma draining devices. However, postoperative outcomes are not very promising due to severe amblyopia and other ocular complications, including glaucoma or retinal detachment.

== History ==
This congenital anomaly was first described by German ophthalmologist Albert Peters (1862–1938).
