= Corneal hydrops =

- Other names: Corneal rupture
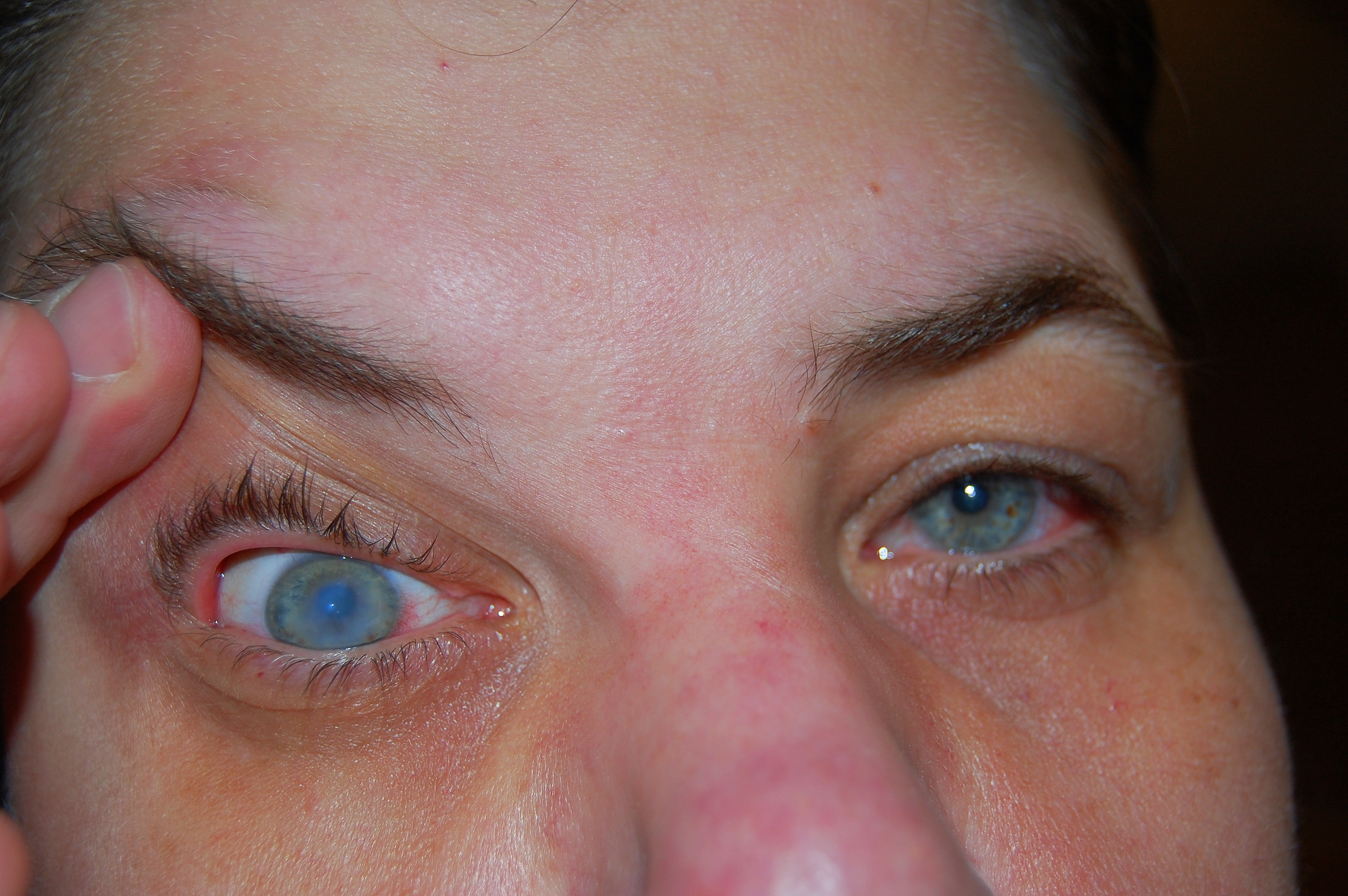
- Corneal hydrops due to keratoconus
- Specialty: Ophthalmology

Corneal hydrops is an uncommon complication seen in people with advanced keratoconus or other corneal ectatic disorders, and is characterized by stromal edema due to leakage of aqueous humor through a tear in Descemet's membrane. Although a hydrops usually causes increased scarring of the cornea, occasionally it will benefit a patient by creating a flatter cone, aiding the fitting of contact lenses. Corneal transplantation is not usually indicated during corneal hydrops.

== Signs and symptoms ==
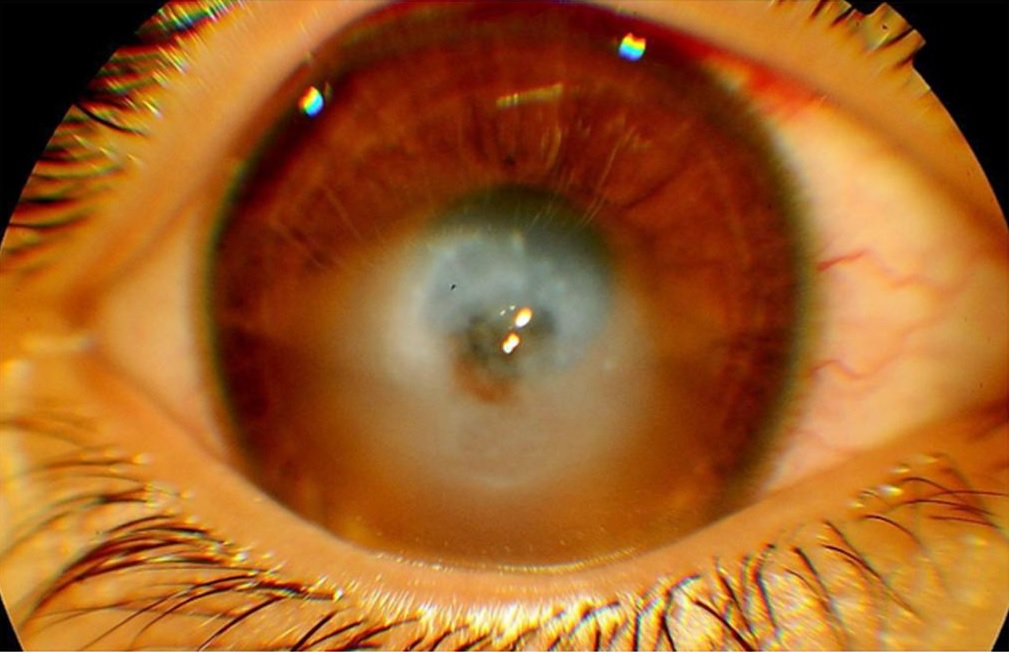
Central Descemet's membrane rupture with inferocentral corneal edema (hydrops).

The person experiences pain and a sudden severe clouding of vision, with the cornea taking on a translucent milky-white appearance known as a corneal hydrops.

== Diagnosis ==
Patients are recommended to take a sodium chloride eye drop solution as well as a dexamethasone solution for a period of 4-6 weeks, timeframes may vary depending on the severity of a patient's condition. Once the medication cycle is complete and the cloud clears, scarring will be left on the cornea.

== Management ==
The effect is normally temporary and after a period of six to eight weeks, the cornea usually returns to its former transparency. The recovery can be aided nonsurgically by bandaging with an osmotic saline solution. Non-steroidal anti-inflammatory topical may be used to reduce the pain and inflammation.

== Research ==
Corneal hydrops might be caused by a tear in the recently discovered Dua's layer, a 15 micron thick layer between the corneal stroma and Descemet's membrane, Harminder Dua suggests that this finding will affect corneal surgery, including penetrating keratoplasty, and understanding of corneal dystrophies and pathologies, such as acute hydrops.
