= Harminder Dua =

Indian-British medical doctor and researcher

Harminder Singh Dua CBE FRCS (Punjabi: ਹਰਮਿੰਦਰ ਸਿੰਘ ਦੂਆ) is an Indian-British medical doctor and researcher. He is chair and professor of ophthalmology at University of Nottingham and is the head of the Division of Ophthalmology and Visual Sciences.

Born in Jalandhar, Punjab, India, he studied medicine at the Government Medical College and Hospital, Nagpur. He was formerly associate professor at the Thomas Jefferson University, Philadelphia, USA, before joining Nottingham in April 1994.

Dua has been the co-editor-in-chief with Arun Singh of the British Journal of Ophthalmology; president of the EVERf (European Association for Vision and Eye Research Foundation); president of EuCornea, the European society of Cornea and Ocular surface disease specialists; chair of Academia Ophthalmologica Internationalis; and a member of the American Ophthalmological Society. In March 2011, he was elected president of the Royal College of Ophthalmologists, UK, beginning his term on 25 May 2011.

Dua was appointed Commander of the Order of the British Empire (CBE) in the 2019 Birthday Honours for services to ophthalmology. In March, 2021 he was appointed to the ceremonial post of Sheriff of Nottingham for 2021-22.

== Discovery of Dua's layer ==
In a 2013 paper, Dua and others at the University of Nottingham reported discovery of a previously unknown layer of the human cornea measuring just 15 micrometres thick between the corneal stroma and Descemet's membrane. They refer to the reported layer as Dua's layer. However, this was considered very controversial in the field due to the convention within the medical community to stop using eponyms. In 2001, he proposed Dua classification for chemical injuries in eye.

== See also ==
- List of British Sikhs
