= Peters syndrome =

Peters syndrome may refer to:

- Peters-plus syndrome
- Peters anomaly of the eye
