= VSX1 =

Protein-coding gene in the species Homo sapiens

Identifiers
- Aliases: VSX1, CAASDS, KTCN, KTCN1, PPCD, PPCD1, PPD, RINX, visual system homeobox 1
- External IDs: OMIM: 605020; MGI: 1890816; GeneCards: VSX1

Gene location (Human)
Chr.	Chromosome 20 (human)
Band	20p11.21	Start	25,070,885 bp
Band	20p11.21	End	25,082,141 bp

Gene location (Mouse)
Chr.	Chromosome 2 (mouse)
Band	2 G3|2 74.74 cM	Start	150,522,622 bp
Band	2 G3|2 74.74 cM	End	150,531,280 bp
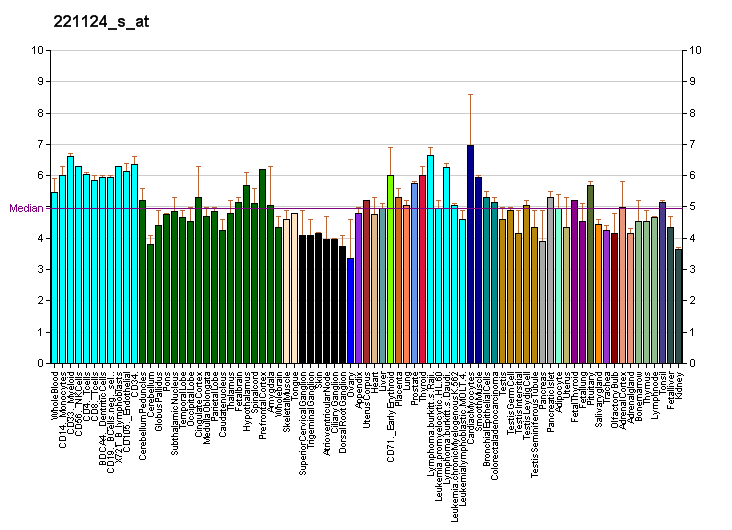
RNA expression pattern
Bgee	Human / Mouse (ortholog); Top expressed in: cerebellar hemisphere; right hemisphere of cerebellum; testicle; buccal mucosa cell; anterior pituitary; amygdala; hypothalamus; anterior cingulate cortex; substantia nigra; nucleus accumbens / Top expressed in: neural layer of retina; embryo; morula; gastrula; blastocyst; pituitary gland; neural tube; lens; More reference expression data
BioGPS	More reference expression data
Gene ontology
Molecular function	DNA-binding transcription factor activity; sequence-specific DNA binding; DNA binding; chromatin binding; DNA-binding transcription factor activity, RNA polymerase II-specific
Cellular component	nucleus; cellular component
Biological process	multicellular organism development; transcription, DNA-templated; response to stimulus; visual perception; neuron maturation; retinal bipolar neuron differentiation; regulation of transcription, DNA-templated; neuron development; regulation of transcription by RNA polymerase II
Sources:Amigo / QuickGO
Orthologs
Databases	NCBI: entry; OMA: entry
Species	Human	Mouse
Entrez	30813	114889
Ensembl	ENSG00000100987	ENSMUSG00000033080
UniProt	Q9NZR4	Q91V10
RefSeq (mRNA)	NM_001256271; NM_001256272; NM_014588; NM_199425; NM_001378633	NM_054068
RefSeq (protein)	NP_001243200; NP_001243201; NP_055403; NP_955457; NP_001365562	NP_473409
Location (UCSC)	Chr 20: 25.07 – 25.08 Mb	Chr 2: 150.52 – 150.53 Mb
PubMed search
- Wikidata
View/Edit Human	View/Edit Mouse

Visual system homeobox 1 is a protein that in humans is encoded by the VSX1 gene.

The protein encoded by this gene contains a paired-like homeodomain and binds to the core of the locus control region of the red/green cone opsin gene cluster. The encoded protein may regulate expression of the cone opsin genes early in development. Mutations in this gene can cause posterior polymorphous corneal dystrophy (PPCD) and keratoconus. Two transcript variants encoding different isoforms have been found for this gene.
