= Choroidal fissure =

The choroid is the middle, vascular coat of the eye which resides between the sclera and the retina. Early in development the choroidal fissure is a groove that extends along the ventral aspect of the optic stalk. In effect, it is a continuation of the invagination that forms the optic cup during early development in amniotes. For a period of time this groove extends to the closing lips of the optic cup. During development it is through the choroidal fissure that the retinal vessels enter and leave the eye. While optic neural components (e.g. axons arising from retinal ganglion cells in the sensory retina) do not lie in the groove that is the choroidal fissure, they do extend through the portions of the optic stalk that form the walls of the fissure. These axons will form the optic nerve. The fissure is eventually sealed when the lips of the optic cup, as well as the edges of the groove in the optic stalk, fuse. Failure of this fissure to close results in coloboma iridis.
