= Ocular straylight =

Scattering of light by parts of the eye

Ocular straylight is a phenomenon where parts of the eye are able to scatter light, creating glare. It is analogous to stray light in other optical systems; scattered light reaches the retina, but does not contribute to forming a correct image.

One can observe the effect of straylight by looking at a distant bright light source against a dark background. If the source is small, it would look like a small bright spot if the eye imaged it perfectly. Scattering in the eye makes the source appear spread out, surrounded by glare. The disability glare caused by such a situation has been found to correspond precisely to the effect of true light. As a consequence, disability glare was subsequently defined by this true light, called "straylight".

== Individual differences ==
Straylight can differ considerably between individuals. Aging of the crystalline lens of the human eye causes straylight to become worse. Lens extraction and artificial lens implantation is an effective treatment.

Less common causes for straylight include:

- Diseases of the cornea, e.g. Fuchs' dystrophy.
- Lack of pigmentation, e.g. albinism.
- Laser refractive surgery, with occasional haze formation.
- Excessive floaters in the vitreous humour.
- Contact lenses.
