= PPCD =

The PPCD acronym may mean:

- Christian-Democratic National Peasants' Party (Romania)
- Christian-Democratic People's Party (Moldova)
- Posterior polymorphous corneal dystrophy
