= Peripheral ulcerative keratitis =

Peripheral Ulcerative Keratitis (PUK) is a group of destructive inflammatory diseases involving the peripheral cornea in human eyes. The symptoms of PUK include pain, redness of the eyeball, photophobia, and decreased vision accompanied by distinctive signs of crescent-shaped damage of the cornea. The causes of this disease are broad, ranging from injuries, contamination of contact lenses, to association with other systemic conditions. PUK is associated with different ocular and systemic diseases. Mooren's ulcer is a common form of PUK. The majority of PUK is mediated by local or systemic immunological processes, which can lead to inflammation and eventually tissue damage. Standard PUK diagnostic test involves reviewing the medical history and a completing physical examinations. Two major treatments are the use of medications such as corticosteroids or other immunosuppressive agents and surgical resection of the conjunctiva. The prognosis of PUK is unclear with one study providing potential complications. PUK is a rare condition with an estimated incidence of 3 per million annually.

== Signs and symptoms ==
The most easily identifiable sign is a visible lesion of the cornea presented usually in a crescent shape. Common reasons for destruction are stromal degradation and epithelial defects on the inflammatory cells. There would be a change in conformation of the peripheral cornea, depending on the severity of corneal thinning. This process is usually accompanied by the possibility of concealing perforation. The formation of an oval-shaped ulcer at the margin of the cornea is also a sign.

Symptoms of PUK include pain, redness, tearing, increased sensitivity to bright light, impaired or blurred vision, and the feeling of foreign objects trapped in the eyes.

=== Association ===
There are several associations of PUK to ocular and systemic diseases. Rheumatoid arthritis (RA), granulomatosis with polyangiitis (GPA), and Polyarteritis Nodosa (PAN) are the most common systemic conditions.

- Rheumatoid arthritis: Approximately 50% of PUK are related to collagen vascular diseases, in which RA is the most common category. Around 34-42% of PUK patients have RA.
- Granulomatosis with polyangiitis: GPA is a rare autoimmune disease associated with PUK. It causes vasculitis of the lower and upper respiratory tracts, and it also affects multiple organs, including eyes. Without timely initiation of systemic therapy, GPA patients will develop conjunctival and scleral inflammations. The inflammation will eventually cause corneal thinning and worsen PUK.
- Polyarteritis Nodosa: PAN is another autoimmune disease in which the body's immune system attacks small and medium-sized arteries of its own by mistake. PUK is one of the predominant ocular inflammatory manifestations of PAN.

== Causes ==
There are three major causes for PUK. One possible cause is injury due to any kind of scratches by sharp or hard objects on the surface of the cornea. The scratched area forms an opening in the cornea, allowing microorganisms to access the cornea and lead to infection. Contamination of contact lenses is another cause as fungi, bacteria and parasites, microscopic parasite acanthamoeba, in particular, could inhabit the surface of the carrying case of the contact lens. When placing the contact lens to one's eyes, invisible microorganisms may contaminate the cornea resulting in PUK. An extended period of wearing contact lenses could also cause damage on the cornea surface, allowing the entry of microorganisms to the cornea. Other than contamination of contact lenses, contamination occurring in water could also cause PUK. Especially in places like the ocean, rivers, lakes and hot tubs, massive amounts of bacteria, fungi, and parasites exist. When there is an injury on the cornea surface, contact with contaminated water could transfer unwanted microorganisms into the cornea resulting in PUK. Virus and bacteria are sources of infection to the cornea. Herpes virus and bacteria that cause gonorrhea are some examples.

== Pathogenesis ==
The corneal epithelium consists of five to six layers of cells with a total thickness of around 0.52mm. The cornea thickens to 0.65mm towards the periphery of the cornea. Stroma, which accounts for 90% of the corneal thickness, refers to the middle layer between epithelium and endothelium. It is present in the peripheral cornea to act as a transitional zone between the sclera and cornea. Limbal vasculature, deriving from capillaries that surround the peripheral cornea, supplies the stroma. Various molecules normally diffuse from these capillaries at the periphery to the central cornea. With limited diffusion, there is a higher concentration of IgM, factor C1 of the complement cascade, and Langerhans cells.

Any kind of inflammatory stimulus present in the peripheral cornea results in the recruitment of neutrophils and activation of both classical and alternative pathways of immune response, namely the humoral and cell-mediated autoimmune responses. These responses will lead to the formation of antigen-specific antibodies to combat foreign antigens. However, antigen-antibody complexes formed may deposit in the vascular endothelium and activate complements leading to severe local inflammation. Under this circumstance, inflammatory cells, such as macrophages and neutrophils, enter the peripheral cornea. These inflammatory cells release enzymes protease and collagenases, causing potential disruption of the corneal stroma. The additional release of cytokines, for example, interleukin-1, from these cells further accelerates the process of stromal destruction.

== Diagnosis ==
There are many investigative modalities available for diagnosing PUK, including history review and physical examination. A thorough history of ocular infections, contact lens usage, other medication, or surgery is necessary to identify possible presence of associated diseases. An ophthalmic examination helps identify whether it is due to local pathogenesis. Physical examinations allow more understanding of the underlying systemic process.

A standard testing procedure includes hematological investigations, immunological testing, followed by chest X-ray. Hematological investigations are blood tests estimating hemoglobin, platelet counts, total white blood cell counts, erythrocyte sedimentation rate and viscosity. Other common body checks include urinalysis and liver and renal function tests. The selection of immunological testing for various markers is based on numerous additional medical examinations and clinical history of the patient. Possible markers are antinuclear antibodies, anti-rheumatoid antibodies, and antibodies to cyclic citrullinated peptides. Finally, a chest X-ray helps distinguish whether there are complications, such as pulmonary diseases, due to systemic conditions associated with PUK.

One of the common causes of PUK is ocular infections by microorganisms such as bacteria, viruses, and fungi. To detect the causative microorganism, doctors usually collect samples before the commencement of therapy and send them to laboratories. Laboratory personnel then perform smear examination, inoculate the samples on culture media, and perform serological testing. Serological testing is an antibody test providing information on PUK etiology. The diagnosis of PUK due to systemic conditions requires a combination of serological and hematological testing, together with imaging techniques such as radiography and CT scanning.

=== Mooren's ulcer and relevant classification ===
Mooren's ulcer is a common form of PUK. One classification of Mooren's ulcer, based on the clinical presentation, includes bilateral indolent Mooren's ulcer, bilateral aggressive Mooren's ulcer and unilateral Mooren's ulcer. Unilateral Mooren's ulcer, meaning ulcer of one eye, mainly affects elderly above 60 years old. Rapid onset with redness and severe pain of the affected eye and either slow or extremely quick progression are some typical characteristics of unilateral Mooren's ulcer. Bilateral aggressive Mooren's ulcer is prevalent in Indian between age 14 to 40. The common presentation includes the appearance of lesions in one eye, followed by the development of lesions in another eye. Finally, bilateral indolent Mooren's ulcer is common in patients of at least 50-year-old. It usually progresses slowly and causes little or no pain.

Other classification methods also exist. The first one is classifying Mooren's ulcers based on clinical presentation and prognosis into two categories. The first type is usually presented unilaterally, accompanied by symptoms ranging from mild to moderate. Therefore, it has a more effective response to treatment. In contrast, type II appears in a bilateral manner, with severe symptoms and poor outcome of treatment. The second classification is based on severity. Grade I refers to corneal thinning, grade II describes impending corneal perforation, and grade III is corneal perforation with a diameter greater than 2mm.

== Treatments ==
Various PUK therapies are of different objectives, for example, inflammation control, halting of disease progression, stroma repairment, avoidance of secondary complications, and vision restoration. A thorough understanding of PUK and different therapies is important. Medical and surgical treatments are two major approaches to manage PUK.

=== Medical therapy ===
As for medical therapy, there are several types of drugs available for PUK. Topical corticosteroids usually serve as therapy for milder unilateral cases of RA-associated PUK. Systemic corticosteroids in the form of an oral dose are the acute management of more severe cases. However, there are side effects with prolonged usage of oral corticosteroids. Immunosuppressive agents, such as azathioprine, cyclophosphamide, and methotrexate, have demonstrated efficacy in treating inflammatory eye diseases, including PUK. The combined therapy of systemic corticosteroids up to 100 mg/day and immunosuppressive agents are used for severe cases of PUK. Biological agents, such as anti-tissue necrosis factors (anti-TNF), is a well-established treatment of systemic inflammatory diseases, Infliximab and Adalimumab are TNF blockers for treating RA-associated PUK. However, the high cost and uncertainty of long-term side effects are the possible drawbacks.

=== Surgical treatment ===
In terms of surgical treatment, conjunctival resection is a common procedure, which can temporarily remove local inflammatory mediators and collagenases and therefore slow down the disease progression. Other surgical management includes corneal gluing, or keratoplasty procedures. Corneal transplantation is a management option when there is severe corneal melting or perforation although one possible disadvantage is the risk of rejection.

Surgical treatment helps maintain the integrity of the globe, but it is usually complementary because it alone cannot influence the underlying immunological process. Therefore, medical and surgical treatments are commonly used in conjunction.

=== Choice of treatment ===
The choice of treatment may be different depending on the nature of PUK, infectious or noninfectious. Selection of the right targeted antimicrobial therapy for infectious PUK is based on clinical judgement and culture results. For example, the appropriate treatment for bacterial infections is antibiotics, such as fluoroquinolones. As for Mooren's ulcers, 56% of unilateral PUK and 50% of bilateral PUK in one eye showed recovery with intensive topical steroids. Only 18% of patients with bilateral ulcers occurring simultaneously in both eyes show improvements with topical steroids alone; therefore a combination of immunosuppressive agents and systemic steroids should be given in early courses of management. Corticosteroids are the first line of therapy, but side effects may arise from long-term usage. In addition, conjunctival resection can be performed to temporarily remove local inflammatory mediators, followed by the use of immunosuppressants.

== Prognosis ==
Currently, there are limited studies regarding the prognosis of PUK. However, one study has pointed out possible complications surrounding PUK include moderate to severe vision loss, corneal perforation and increased risk of recurrence.

== Epidemiology ==
PUK is a rare condition with an estimated incidence of 3 per million annually. Studies have reported that most patients with PUK are older than 60 years of age (32%). Among them, men have a higher occurrence rate in men (60%). Most patients live in rural areas (66%) and are in the lower socioeconomic groups. The age of those with PUK ranges from 5 to 89 years, with a mean age of 45.5 years.

The mortality rate after PUK diagnosis in an investigation of 34 patients with and without immunosuppressive medication is 53% and 5%, respectively. Another single-centre study involving 46 patients with RA reported a mortality rate of 15%. Reports have also shown a possibility of PUK occurrence after any ocular surgery. In a retrospective study of 771 eyes, 1.4% of participants reported developing late-onset PUK at an average of 3–6 months after surgery.
