= Fuchs' dystrophy =

Progressive eye disease

- Other names: Fuchs endothelial corneal dystrophy (FECD)
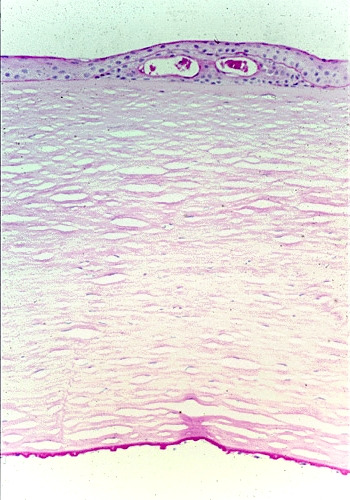
- Fuchs corneal dystrophy. Light microscopic appearance of the cornea showing numerous excrescences (guttae) on the posterior surface of Descemet's membrane and the presence of cysts in the corneal epithelium beneath ectopically placed intraepithelial basement membrane. Periodic acid-Schiff stain. From a review by Klintworth, 2009.
- Pronunciation: /fuːksˈdɪstrəfi/ fooks-DIS-trə-fee
- Specialty: Ophthalmology

Fuchs dystrophy, also referred to as Fuchs endothelial corneal dystrophy (FECD) and Fuchs endothelial dystrophy (FED), is a slowly progressing corneal dystrophy that usually affects both eyes and is slightly more common in women than in men. Although early signs of Fuchs dystrophy are sometimes seen in people in their 30s and 40s, the disease rarely affects vision until people reach their 50s and 60s.

== Signs and symptoms ==
As a progressive, chronic condition, signs and symptoms of Fuchs dystrophy gradually progress over decades of life, starting in middle age. Early symptoms include blurry vision upon wakening which improves during the morning, as fluid retained in the cornea is unable to evaporate through the surface of the eye when the lids are closed overnight. As the disease worsens, the interval of blurry morning vision extends from minutes to hours.

In moderate stages of the disease, an increase in guttae and swelling in the cornea can contribute to changes in vision and decreased sharpness throughout the day. Contrast sensitivity may be affected. The change in the refractive index of the cornea may result in subtle refractive shifts, which affected individuals may experience as a small change in their eyeglass prescription.

In the late stages of the disease, the cornea is unable to maintain its fluid content and blisters, known as bullae, form on the surface of the cornea. These cause foreign body sensations and can be painful. The cornea may not heal from such epithelial defects, until corneal transplantation is able to restore the endothelial pump function.

== Cause ==
FECD is a degenerative disease of the corneal endothelium with accumulation of focal outgrowths called guttae (meaning a drop-like appearance) and thickening of Descemet's membrane, leading to corneal edema and loss of vision. The corneal endothelial cell layer and its basement membrane (Descemet's membrane) act as a barrier to hydration of the corneal stroma by aqueous humor and are "pump" cells of the cornea that function to maintain hydration of the cornea at a specific level that maintains corneal stromal clarity through precise spatial arrangement of collagen fibers. In FED, Descemet's membrane is grossly thickened with accumulation of abnormal wide-spaced collagen and numerous guttae. Corneal endothelial cells in end-stage FED are reduced in number and appear attenuated, causing progressive stromal edema (swelling). Progressive endothelial cell loss causes relative influx of aqueous humor into the cornea, leading to swelling (corneal stromal edema), which results in blurred vision. Eventually, the epithelium also becomes edematous, resulting in more severe visual impairment. Focal blisters of epithelial edema ("bullae") may be particularly painful when they burst.

The inheritance of FECD is complex and polymorphic such that although inheritance is autosomal dominant there are genetic and environmental modifiers that determine the degree to which members of the same family express the disease. There is reasonable evidence of associations between transcription factor 4 (TCF4) genetic polymorphisms and risk of Fuchs' endothelial dystrophy (FED). Endothelial cell loss may be aggravated or accelerated by intraocular trauma or surgery. A common scenario involves prolonged corneal swelling or edema following cataract surgery or other types of ocular surgery. Hence, patients with a history of Fuchs' dystrophy may be at a greater risk of corneal edema after ocular surgery as they have fewer functioning endothelial cells. FECD is classified into 4 stages, from early signs of guttae formation to end-stage subepithelial scarring. Diagnosis is made by biomicroscopic examination in the clinic. Other modalities, such as corneal thickness measurement (pachymetry), in-vivo confocal biomicroscopy, and specular microscopy can be used in conjunction.

The exact pathogenesis is unknown but factors include endothelial cell apoptosis, sex hormones, inflammation, and aqueous humor flow and composition. Mutations in collagen VIII, a major component of Descemet's membrane secreted by endothelial cells, have been linked to the early-onset FECD.

As a genetically heterogeneous disease, the phenotype, or clinical experience of patients with Fuchs dystrophy may reflect the combination of genetic contributors to the disease. Some genetic lesions correlate with more severe disease and earlier onset. Therefore, some individuals may experience symptoms of the disease at a much earlier age, while others may not experience symptoms until late in life.

Genes include:

Type	OMIM	Gene	Locus
FECD1	136800	COL8A2	1p34.3-p32.3
FECD4	610206	SLC4A11	20p13-p12
FECD6	189909	ZEB1	10p11.2

== Diagnosis ==
The diagnosis of Fuchs dystrophy is often made with slit lamp biomicroscopy. With direct illumination, the clinician can visualize guttae, the characteristic pathological changes in disease. Scheimpflug imaging, anterior segment optical coherence tomography, confocal microscopy, and specular microscopy are additional imaging techniques that can identify the presence of guttae and quantify the thickness of the cornea. While corneal thickness can be a valuable indicator of how the cornea is changing over time, it is affected by multiple factors and is not adequate itself as a screening tool to diagnose Fuchs dystrophy.

== Treatment ==
Non-surgical treatments of FECD may be used to treat symptoms of early disease. Medical management includes topical hypertonic saline, the use of a hairdryer to dehydrate the precorneal tear film, and therapeutic soft contact lenses. Hypertonic saline draws water out of the cornea through osmosis. When using a hairdryer, the patient is instructed to hold it at an arm's length or directed across the face in a cold setting, to dry out the epithelial blisters. This can be done two or three times a day. Scleral lenses can improve vision when it is affected by irregularities on the surface of the cornea, but may stress the corneal endothelium.

Corneal transplantation is the definitive treatment for FECD. The most common types of surgery for FECD are Descemet's stripping automated endothelial keratoplasty (DSAEK) and Descemet's membrane endothelial keratoplasty (DMEK), which account for over half of corneal transplants in the United States. Injection of cultured endothelial cells is under investigation and in a series of 11 patients in Japan with bullous keratopathy, was able to clear corneal edema.

== Epidemiology ==
Few studies have examined the prevalence of FECD on a large scale. First assessed in a clinical setting, Fuchs himself estimated the occurrence of dystrophia epithelialis corneae to be one in every 2000 patients; a rate that is likely reflective of those who progress to advanced disease. Cross-sectional studies suggest a relatively higher prevalence of disease in European countries relative to other areas of the world. Fuchs dystrophy rarely affects individuals under 50 years of age.

== History ==
The condition was first described by Austrian ophthalmologist Ernst Fuchs (1851–1930), after whom it is named. In 1910, Fuchs first reported 13 cases of central corneal clouding, loss of corneal sensation and the formation of epithelial bullae, or blisters, which he labeled 'dystrophia epithelialis corneae'. It was characterized by late onset, slow progression, decreased visual acuity in the morning, lack of inflammation, diffuse corneal opacity, intense centrally, and roughened epithelium with vesicle-like features.

A shift to the understanding of FECD as primarily a disease of the corneal endothelium resulted after a number of observations in the 1920s. Crystal-like features of the endothelium were noted by Kraupa in 1920, who suggested that the epithelial changes were dependent on the endothelium. Using a slit lamp, Vogt described the excrescences associated with FCD as drop-like in appearance in 1921. In 1924, Graves then provided an extremely detailed explanation of the endothelial elevations visible with slit lamp biomicroscopy. A patient with unilateral epithelial dystrophy and bilateral endothelial changes was described by the Friedenwalds in 1925; subsequent involvement of the second eye led them to emphasize that endothelial changes preceded epithelial changes. As only a subset of patients with endothelial changes proceeded to epithelial involvement, Graves stated on 19 October 1925 to the New York Academy of Medicine that "Fuchs' epithelial dystrophy may be a very late sequel to severer cases of the deeper affection".

== See also ==
- Fuchs heterochromic iridocyclitis (a disease of the iris)
- Ocular straylight
