= Corneal epithelium =

Outermost layer of the cornea

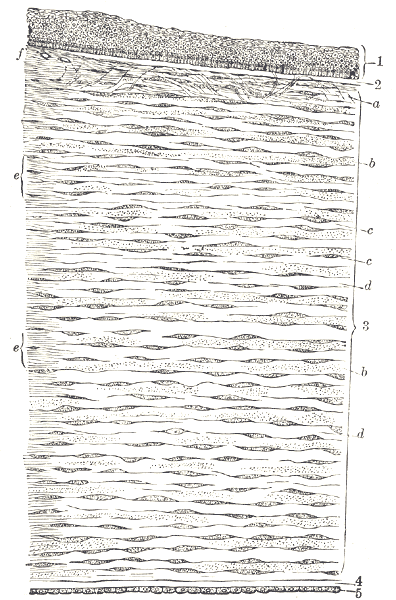
- Vertical section of human cornea from near the margin. (Waldeyer.) Magnified.: 1. Epithelium; 2. Anterior elastic lamina 3. substantia propria 4. Posterior elastic lamina 5. Endothelium of the anterior chamber; 1. Oblique fibers in the anterior layer of the substantia propria 2. Lamellae, the fibers of which are cut across, producing a dotted appearance 3. Corneal corpuscles appearing fusiform in section 4. Lamellae, the fibers of which are cut longitudinally 5. Transition to the sclera, with more distinct fibrillation, and surmounted by a thicker epithelium 6. Small blood vessels cut across near the margin of the cornea

Details

Identifiers
- Latin: Epithelium anterius corneae
- MeSH: D019573
- TA98: A15.2.02.018
- FMA: 58263

The corneal epithelium (epithelium corneae anterior layer) is made up of epithelial tissue and covers the front of the cornea. It acts as a barrier to protect the cornea, resisting the free flow of fluids from the tears, and prevents bacteria from entering the epithelium and corneal stroma.

== Anatomy ==
The corneal epithelium consists of several layers of cells. The cells of the deepest layer are columnar, known as basal cells which are attached by multiprotein complexes known as hemidesmosomes to an underlying basement membrane. Then follow two or three layers of polyhedral cells, commonly known as wing cells. The majority of these are prickle cells, similar to those found in the stratum mucosum of the cuticle. Lastly, there are three or four layers of squamous cells, with flattened nuclei. The layers of the epithelium are constantly undergoing mitosis. Basal and wing cells migrate to the anterior of the cornea, while squamous cells ] Central thickness of corneal epithelial layer is approximately 50 to 52 μm.

== Cornea cell LASIK complication ==
Epithelial ingrowth is a LASIK complication in which cells from the cornea surface layer (epithelial cells) begin to grow underneath the corneal flap. This complication is not present in PRK or other non-flap vision correction procedures.

== See also ==
- Stratified squamous epithelium

== Disorders ==
- Peripheral ulcerative keratitis
- Recurrent corneal erosion
