= Peters-plus syndrome =

- Other names: Krause–van Schooneveld–Kivlin syndrome
- This condition is inherited in an autosomal recessive manner

Peters-plus syndrome or Krause–Kivlin syndrome is a hereditary syndrome defined by Peters' anomaly, dwarfism and intellectual disability.

== Signs and symptoms ==
Features of this syndrome include Peters' anomaly, corneal opacity, central defect of Descemet's membrane, and shallow anterior chamber with synechiae between the iris and cornea.

Craniofacial abnormalities commonly seen in patients with PPS include hypertelorism, ear malformations, micrognathia, round face and broad neck, and cleft lip and palate.

Infants are commonly born small for gestational age and have delayed growth. It is associated with short limb dwarfism and mild to severe intellectual disability and autism spectrum disorder.

== Cause ==
The pattern of inheritance of Peters-plus is autosomal recessive, where both parents are heterozygous they can produce a child with the syndrome. The gene B3GLCT (previously denoted B3GALTL) codes for the enzyme beta 3-glucosyltransferase (B3Glc-T).

The beta 3-glucosyltransferase enzyme is responsible for a type of glycosylation, the attachment of sugars to proteins, which through this modification allows for performance of a wider variety of functions. The mutations of the B3GLCT gene in affected individuals results in loss-of-function of the beta 3-glucosyltransferase enzyme. The result of this disruption in glycosylation is a change to the secondary structure of the mRNA. These mutations of the B3GLCT gene lead to the production of an abnormally short, nonfunctional version of the beta 3-glucosyltransferase (B3Glc-T) enzyme, which disrupts glycosylation.

The phenotypic effects of the B3GLCT mutations result in a triad of well known phenotypes; Peters anomaly (also classified as anterior segment defects, a defect in the anterior cornea), short stature, brachydactyly, in addition to several other less frequently observed phenotypes. A study of 55 patients with Peters-plus-related phenotypes, but lacking the most common combination (Peters anomaly, short stature, and brachydactyly), revealed none of those cases displayed mutation in the B3GLCT gene. Thus PPS-like signs and symptoms, when they occur independently of each other, provide strong evidence that the B3GLCT gene mutation is in fact responsible for actual cases Peters-plus syndrome.

== History ==
Krause–van Schooneveld–Kivlin syndrome is listed as a "rare disease" by the Office of Rare Diseases (ORD) of the National Institutes of Health (NIH).

It was characterized in 1984 by van Schooneveld.

== See also ==
- Peters anomaly
