= X-linked endothelial corneal dystrophy =

- Other names: XECD
- Specialty: Ophthalmology

X-linked endothelial corneal dystrophy (XECD) is a rare form of corneal dystrophy described first in 2006, based on a 4-generation family of 60 members with 9 affected males and 35 trait carriers, which led to mapping the XECD locus to Xq25. It manifests as severe corneal opacification or clouding, sometimes congenital, in the form of a ground glass, milky corneal tissue, and moon crater-like changes of corneal endothelium. Trait carriers manifest only endothelial alterations resembling moon craters.

As of December 2014, the molecular basis for this disease remained unknown, although 181 genes were known to be within the XECD locus, of which 68 were known to be protein-coding.
