= Optic stalk =

Embryonic precursor to the optic nerve

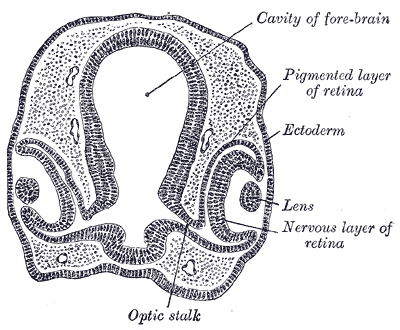
- Transverse section of head of chick embryo of fifty-two hours’ incubation.

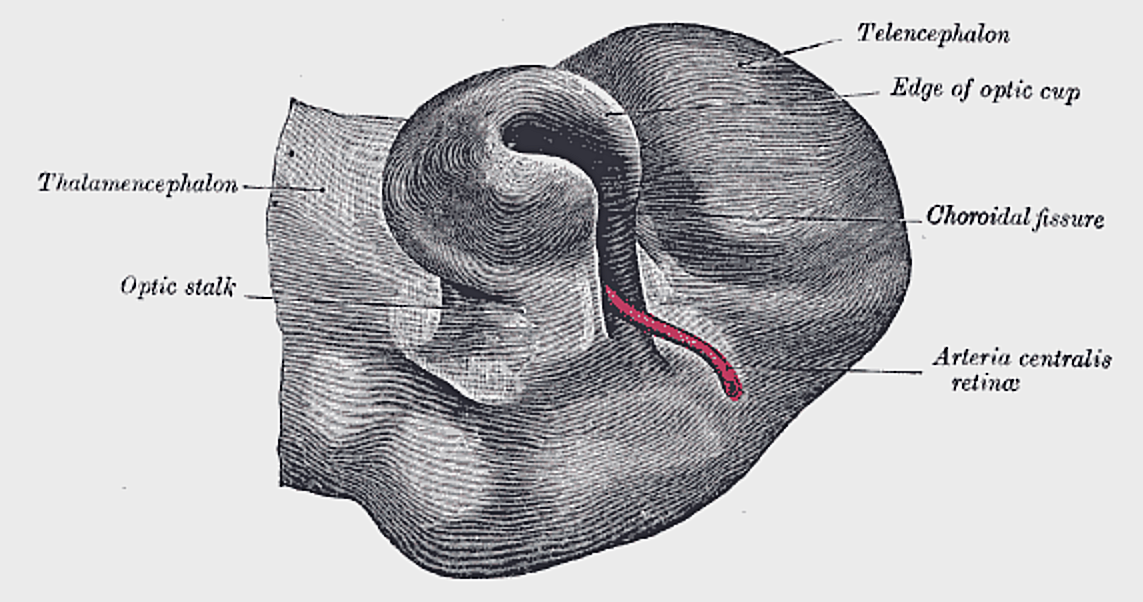
- Optic cup and choroidal fissure seen from below, from a human embryo of about four weeks. (Optic stalk labeled at center left.)

Details
- Carnegie stage: 14

Identifiers
- Latin: pedunculus opticus
- TE: stalk_by_E5.14.3.4.2.2.6 E5.14.3.4.2.2.6

The optic vesicles project toward the sides of the head, and the peripheral part of each expands to form a hollow bulb, while the proximal part remains narrow and constitutes the optic stalk.

Closure of the choroidal fissure in the optic stalk occurs during the seventh week of development. The former optic stalk is then called the optic nerve. In short, the optic stalks are the structures that precede the optic nerves embryologically.
