= Bowman's layer =

Layer in the cornea of the eye

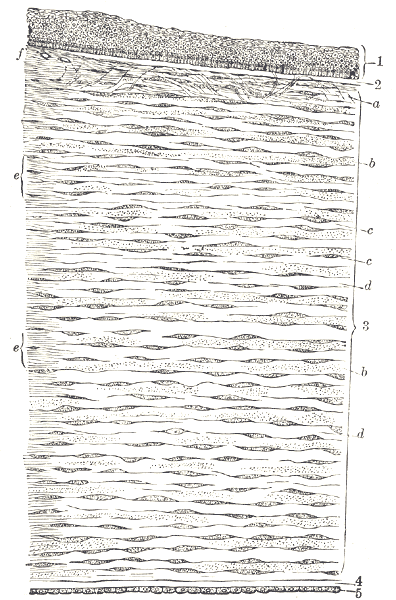
- Vertical section of human cornea from near the margin. Magnified.: 1. Epithelium; 2. Anterior elastic lamina 3. substantia propria 4. Posterior elastic lamina 5. Endothelium of the anterior chamber; 1. Oblique fibers in the anterior layer of the substantia propria 2. Lamellae, the fibers of which are cut across, producing a dotted appearance 3. Corneal corpuscles appearing fusiform in section 4. Lamellae, the fibers of which are cut longitudinally 5. Transition to the sclera, with more distinct fibrillation, and surmounted by a thicker epithelium 6. Small bloodvessels cut across near the margin of the cornea

Details

Identifiers
- Latin: lamina limitans anterior corneae
- MeSH: D050541
- TA98: A15.2.02.019
- FMA: 58273

The Bowman's layer (Bowman's membrane, anterior limiting lamina, anterior elastic lamina) is a smooth, acellular, nonregenerating layer, located between the superficial epithelium and the stroma in the cornea of the eye. It is composed of strong, randomly oriented collagen fibrils in which the smooth anterior surface faces the epithelial basement membrane and the posterior surface merges with the collagen lamellae of the corneal stroma proper.

In adult humans, Bowman's layer is 8-12 μm thick. With ageing, this layer becomes thinner.

The function of the Bowman's layer remains unclear and it appears to have no critical function in corneal physiology. Recently, it is postulated that the layer may act as a physical barrier to protect the subepithelial nerve plexus and thereby hastens epithelial innervation and sensory recovery. Moreover, it may also serve as a barrier that prevents direct traumatic contact with the corneal stroma and hence it is highly involved in stromal wound healing and the associated restoration of anterior corneal transparency at the morphological level.

Part of the Bowman's layer is ablated by the photorefractive keratectomy refractive surgery (commonly known as PRK). As the layer is non-generative, the section of the layer ablated in the procedure is lost forever.

== History ==
The Bowman's layer is named after Sir William Bowman (1816–1892), an English physician, anatomist and ophthalmologist, who discovered this structure. Bowman's layer is not a true basement membrane, despite being originally referred to as such.

== See also ==
- Refractive surgery
- Descemet's membrane
