= Gundersen flap =

Surgical procedure for correcting corneal disease

- Specialty: Ophthalmology

A Gundersen flap, also known as Gundersen's flap, Gundersen's conjunctival flap, or conjunctivoplasty, and often misspelled Gunderson, is a surgical procedure for correcting corneal disease. It involves excising a damaged section of cornea, and replacing it with a section (or "flap") of the patient's own conjunctiva.

It is named for Trygve Gundersen (1902 – February 24, 1987), an American ophthalmologist of Scandinavian descent, who first described the procedure in 1958 at the Massachusetts Eye and Ear Infirmary.
