= Jean Descemet =

French physician and botanist

Jean Descemet was a French physician and botanist (1732–1810) who first described what is now known as Descemet's membrane of the eye. He studied medicine in Paris (doctorate in 1757) and in 1759 he published a Catalog of the plants in the Garden of the Apothecaries in Paris according to their genera and the characteristics of their flowers, using Mr. Tournefort's method (French: Catalogue des plantes du jardin de MM. les apothicaires de Paris, suivant leurs genres et les caractères des fleurs, conformément à la méthode de M. Tournefort) (1759). He is also known for his book Observations sur la choroide, which describes the choroid layer of the eye and was published in 1768 by L'Imprimerie Royale.
