= Collagen, type VIII, alpha 2 =

Protein found in humans

COL8A2

Identifiers
- Aliases: COL8A2, FECD, FECD1, PPCD, PPCD2, collagen type VIII alpha 2, collagen type VIII alpha 2 chain
- External IDs: OMIM: 120252; MGI: 88464; GeneCards: COL8A2

Gene location (Human)
Chr.	Chromosome 1 (human)
Band	1p34.3	Start	36,095,239 bp
Band	1p34.3	End	36,125,222 bp

Gene location (Mouse)
Chr.	Chromosome 4 (mouse)
Band	4 D2.2|4 60.29 cM	Start	126,180,586 bp
Band	4 D2.2|4 60.29 cM	End	126,208,123 bp
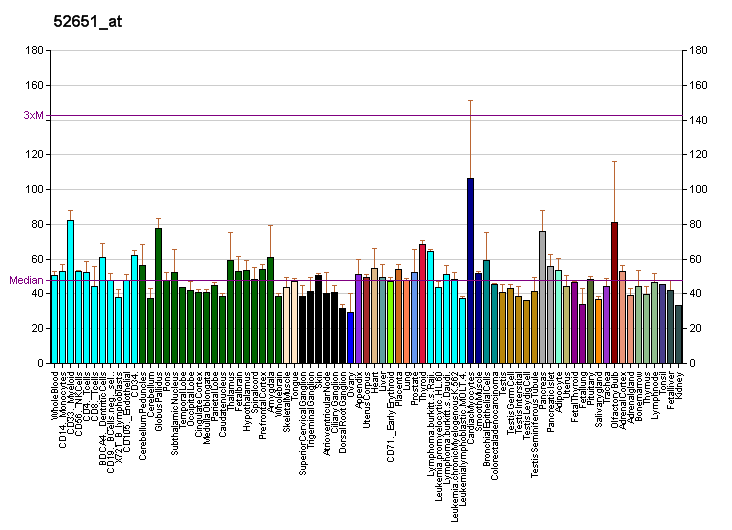

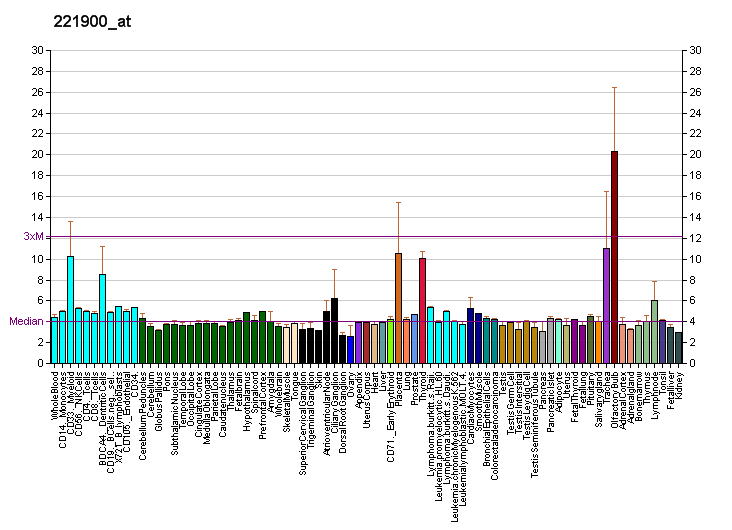
RNA expression pattern
Bgee	Human / Mouse (ortholog); Top expressed in: periodontal fiber; tendon of biceps brachii; ascending aorta; retinal pigment epithelium; Descending thoracic aorta; right coronary artery; popliteal artery; tibial arteries; Epithelium of choroid plexus; cartilage tissue / Top expressed in: Epithelium of choroid plexus; calvaria; retinal pigment epithelium; cornea; condyle; lumbar spinal ganglion; efferent ductule; fossa; vas deferens; iris; More reference expression data
BioGPS	More reference expression data
Gene ontology
Molecular function	protein-macromolecule adaptor activity; extracellular matrix structural constituent; extracellular matrix structural constituent conferring tensile strength; protein binding
Cellular component	extracellular matrix; extracellular region; basement membrane; collagen; endoplasmic reticulum lumen; extracellular space; collagen-containing extracellular matrix
Biological process	collagen catabolic process; extracellular matrix organization; epithelial cell proliferation; cell adhesion; camera-type eye morphogenesis; angiogenesis; cell-cell adhesion
Sources:Amigo / QuickGO
Orthologs
Databases	NCBI: entry; OMA: entry
Species	Human	Mouse
Entrez	1296	329941
Ensembl	ENSG00000171812	ENSMUSG00000056174
UniProt	P25067; Q4VAQ0	P25318
RefSeq (mRNA)	NM_001294347; NM_005202	NM_199473
RefSeq (protein)	NP_001281276; NP_005193	NP_955767
Location (UCSC)	Chr 1: 36.1 – 36.13 Mb	Chr 4: 126.18 – 126.21 Mb
PubMed search
- Wikidata
View/Edit Human	View/Edit Mouse

Collagen alpha-2(VIII) chain is a protein that in humans is encoded by the COL8A2 gene. Mutations of the gene are linked to posterior polymorphous dystrophy type 2.
