= Optic vesicle =

Sac that protrudes from the embryonic forebrain to form each eye

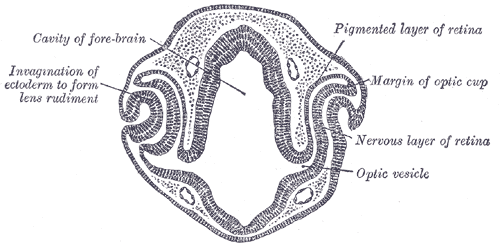
- Transverse section of head of chick embryo of forty-eight hours’ incubation. (Optic vesicle labeled at lower right.)

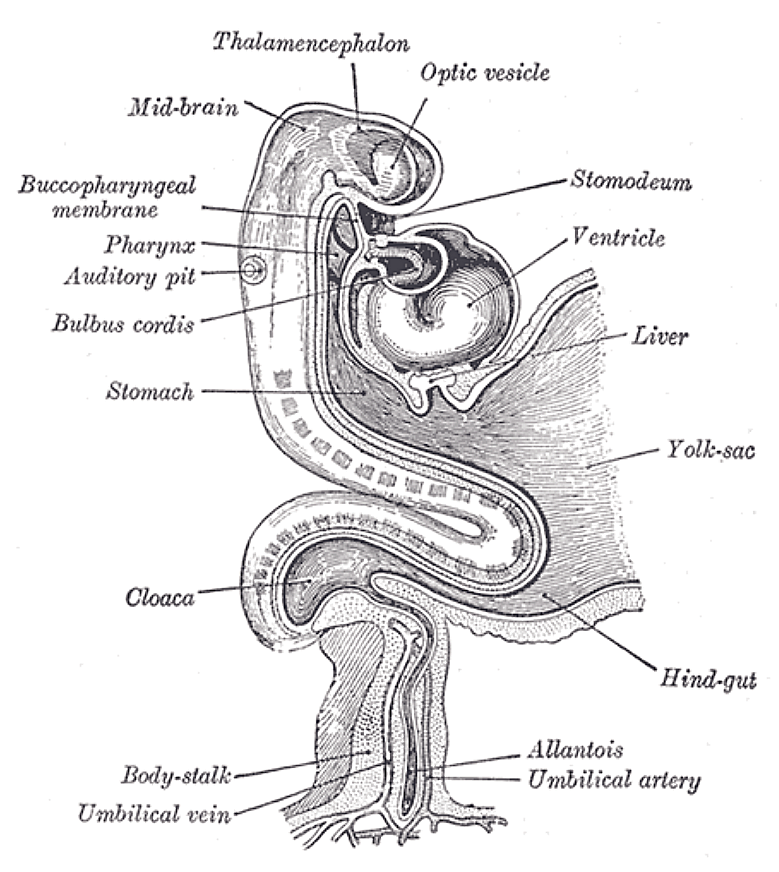
- Human embryo about fifteen days old. Brain and heart represented from right side. Digestive tube and yolk sac in median section. (Optic vesicle labeled at center top.)

Details
- Carnegie stage: 11
- Gives rise to: Human eyes

Identifiers
- Latin: vesicula optica; vesicula ophthalmica
- TE: vesicle_by_E5.14.3.4.2.2.4 E5.14.3.4.2.2.4

The eyes begin to develop as a pair of diverticula (pouches) from the lateral aspects of the forebrain. These diverticula make their appearance before the closure of the anterior end of the neural tube; after the closure of the tube around the 4th week of development, they are known as the optic vesicles. Previous studies of optic vesicles suggest that the surrounding extraocular tissues – the surface ectoderm and extraocular mesenchyme – are necessary for normal eye growth and differentiation.

They project toward the sides of the head, and the peripheral part of each expands to form a hollow bulb, while the proximal part remains narrow and constitutes the optic stalk, which goes on to form the optic nerve.

== Additional images ==
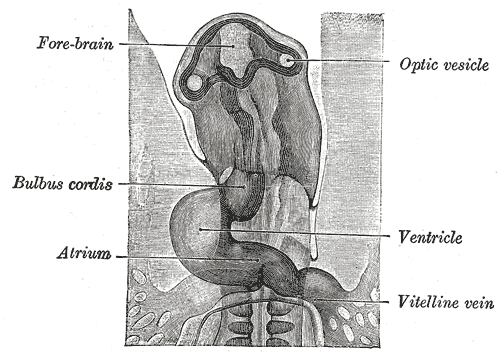
Head of chick embryo of about thirty-eight hours’ incubation, viewed from the ventral surface. X 26

== See also ==
- Eye development
