= Optic cup (embryology) =

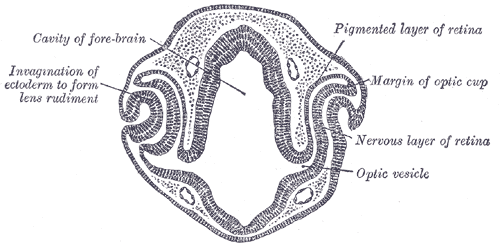
- Transverse section of head of chick embryo of forty-eight hours’ incubation. (Margin of optic cup labeled at upper right.)

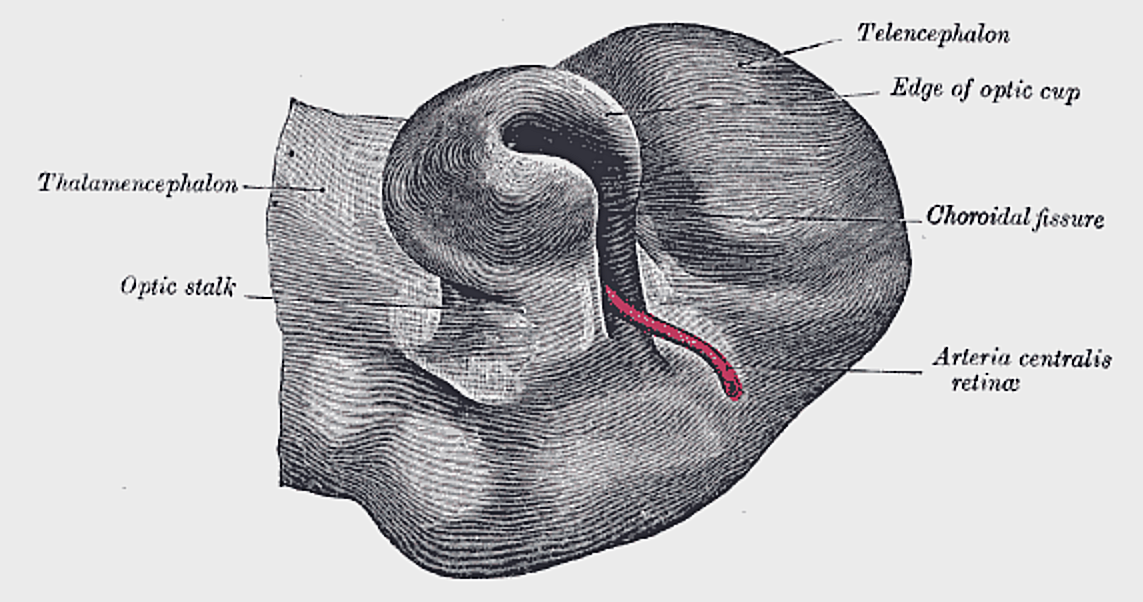
- Optic cup and choroidal fissure seen from below, from a human embryo of about four weeks. (Edge of optic cup labeled at upper right.)

Details
- Carnegie stage: 13
- Days: 36
- Precursor: Optic vesicles

Identifiers
- Latin: cupula optica; caliculus ophthalmicus
- TE: cup (embryology)_by_E5.14.3.4.2.2.7 E5.14.3.4.2.2.7

During embryonic development of the eye, the outer wall of the bulb of the optic vesicles becomes thickened and invaginated, and the bulb is thus converted into a cup, the optic cup (or ophthalmic cup), consisting of two strata of cells. These two strata are continuous with each other at the cup margin, which ultimately overlaps the front of the lens and reaches as far forward as the future aperture of the pupil.

The optic cup is part of the diencephalon and gives rise to the retina of the eye.
