= Stroma of cornea =

Lamellated connective tissue of cornea

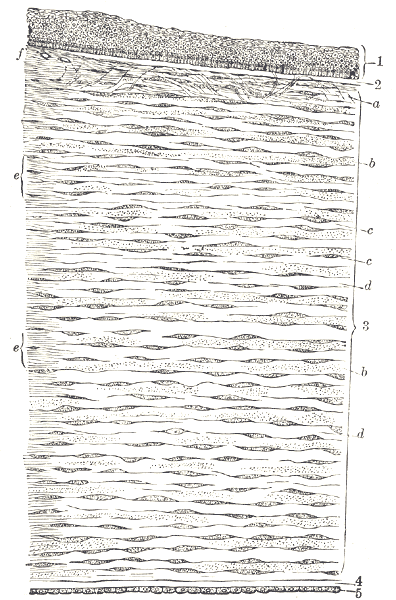
- Vertical section of human cornea from near the margin. (Waldeyer.) Magnified.: 1. Epithelium; 2. Anterior elastic lamina 3. substantia propria 4. Posterior elastic lamina 5. Endothelium of the anterior chamber; 1. Oblique fibers in the anterior layer of the substantia propria 2. Lamellae, the fibers of which are cut across, producing a dotted appearance 3. Corneal corpuscles appearing fusiform in section 4. Lamellae, the fibers of which are cut longitudinally 5. Transition to the sclera, with more distinct fibrillation, and surmounted by a thicker epithelium 6. Small blood vessels cut across near the margin of the cornea

Details

Identifiers
- Latin: substantia propria corneae
- MeSH: D003319
- TA98: A15.2.02.020
- FMA: 58306

The stroma of the cornea (or substantia propria) is a fibrous, tough, unyielding, perfectly transparent and the thickest layer of the cornea of the eye. It is between Bowman's layer anteriorly, and Descemet's membrane posteriorly.

At its centre, a human corneal stroma is composed of about 200 flattened lamellae (layers of collagen fibrils), superimposed one on another. They are each about 1.5-2.5 μm in thickness. The anterior lamellae interweave more than posterior lamellae. The fibrils of each lamella are parallel with one another, but at different angles to those of adjacent lamellae. The lamellae are produced by keratocytes (corneal connective tissue cells), which occupy about 10% of the substantia propria.

Apart from the cells, the major non-aqueous constituents of the stroma are collagen fibrils and proteoglycans. The collagen fibrils are made of a mixture of type I and type V collagens. These molecules are tilted by about 15 degrees to the fibril axis, and because of this, the axial periodicity of the fibrils is reduced to 65 nm (in tendons, the periodicity is 67 nm). The diameter of the fibrils is remarkably uniform and varies from species to species. In humans, it is about 31 nm. Proteoglycans are made of a small protein core to which one or more glycosaminoglycan (GAG) chains are attached. The GAG chains are negatively charged. In corneas we can find two different types of proteoglycans: Chondroitin sulphate/dermatan sulphate (CD/DS) and keratan sulphate (KS). In bovine corneas, the length of the CS/DS proteoglycans is about 70 nm, while the KS proteoglycans are about 40 nm long. Proteoglycan protein cores attach to the surface of the collagen fibrils with the GAG chains projecting outwards. The GAG chains are able to form antiparallel links with other GAG chains from adjacent fibrils, perhaps through the mediation of positively charged ions. In such a way, bridges are formed between adjacent collagen fibrils. These bridges are subject to thermal motion which prevents them from assuming a fully extended conformation. This results in forces that tend to move adjacent fibrils close to each other. At the same time the charges on the GAG chains attract ions and water molecules by the Donnan effect. The increased water volume between the fibrils results in forces that tend to push the fibrils apart. A balance between attractive and repulsive forces is reached for specific inter-fibrillar distances, which depends on the type of proteoglycans present. Locally, the separations between adjacent collagen fibrils are very uniform.

Stromal transparency is mainly a consequence of the remarkable degree of order in the arrangement of the collagen fibrils in the lamellae and of fibril diameter uniformity. Light entering the cornea is scattered by each fibril. The arrangement and the diameter of the fibrils is such that scattered light interferes constructively only in the forward direction, allowing the light through to the retina.

The fibrils in the lamellae are directly continuous with those of the sclera, in which they are grouped together in fibre bundles. More collagen fibres run in a temporal-nasal direction than run in the superior-inferior direction.

During development of the embryo, the corneal stroma is derived from the neural crest (a source of mesenchyme in the head and neck) which has been shown to contain mesenchymal stem cells.

== Disorders of stroma ==
- Keratoconus is a condition caused by disorganised lamellae, leading to thinned and conical-shaped cornea
- Macular corneal dystrophy, associated with the loss of keratan sulfate
