= Cornea =

Transparent front layer of the eye

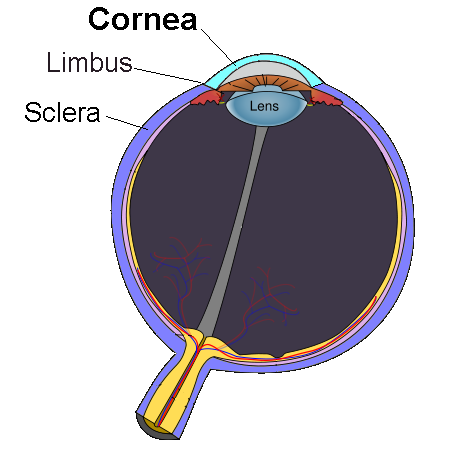
- Schematic diagram of the right human eye showing the cornea as separated from the sclera by the corneal limbus

Details
- Part of: Front of eye
- System: Visual system
- Function: Refract light

Identifiers
- Latin: cornea
- MeSH: D003315
- TA98: A15.2.02.012
- TA2: 6744
- FMA: 58238

The cornea is the transparent front part of the eyeball which covers the iris, pupil, and anterior chamber. Along with the anterior chamber and lens, the cornea refracts light, accounting for approximately two-thirds of the eye's total optical power. In humans, the refractive power of the cornea is approximately 43 dioptres. The cornea can be reshaped by surgical procedures such as LASIK.

While the cornea contributes most of the eye's focusing power, its focus is fixed. Accommodation (the refocusing of light to better view near objects) is accomplished by changing the geometry of the lens. Medical terms related to the cornea often start with the prefix "kerat-" from the Greek word κέρας 'horn'.

== Structure ==
The cornea has unmyelinated nerve endings sensitive to touch, temperature and chemicals; a touch of the cornea causes an involuntary reflex to close the eyelid. Because transparency is of prime importance, the healthy cornea does not have or need blood vessels within it. Instead, oxygen dissolves in tears and then diffuses throughout the cornea to keep it healthy. A 2023 hypothesis by Mazyar Yazdani from Oslo University Hospital proposed that the tear film lipid layer may contribute to corneal oxygen supply. Similarly, nutrients are transported via diffusion from the tear fluid through the outside surface and the aqueous humour through the inside surface. Nutrients also reach the cornea via neurotrophins supplied by the nerves of the cornea. In humans, the cornea has a diameter of about 11.5 mm and a thickness of 0.5–0.6 mm in the center and 0.6–0.8 mm at the periphery. Transparency, avascularity, the presence of immature resident immune cells, and immunologic privilege makes the cornea a very special tissue.

The most abundant soluble protein in mammalian cornea is albumin.

The human cornea borders with the sclera at the corneal limbus. In lampreys, the cornea is solely an extension of the sclera, and is separate from the skin above it, but in more advanced vertebrates it is always fused with the skin to form a single structure, albeit one composed of multiple layers. In fish, and aquatic vertebrates in general, the cornea plays no role in focusing light, since it has virtually the same refractive index as water.

=== Microanatomy ===
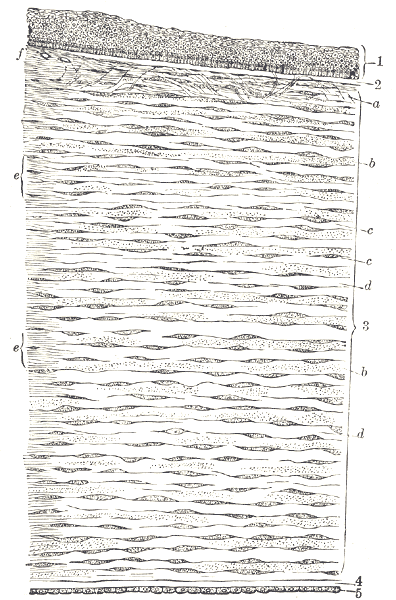
Vertical section of human cornea from near the margin. (Waldeyer.) Magnified. 1: Epithelium. 2: Anterior elastic lamina. 3: substantia propria. 4: Posterior elastic lamina (Descemet's membrane). 5: Endothelium of the anterior chamber. a: Oblique fibers in the anterior layer of the substantia propria. b: Lamellae, the fibers of which are cut across, producing a dotted appearance. c: Corneal corpuscles appearing fusiform in section. d: Lamellae, the fibers of which are cut longitudinally. e: Transition to the sclera, with more distinct fibrillation, and surmounted by a thicker epithelium. f: Small blood vessels cut across near the margin of the cornea.

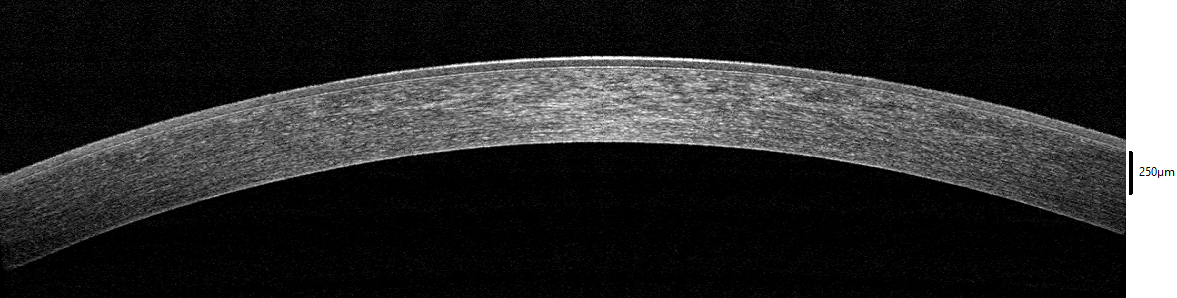
Corneal cross-section imaged by an SD-OCT

The human cornea has five layers (possibly six, if the Dua's layer is included). Corneas of other primates have five known layers. The corneas of cats, dogs, wolves, and other carnivores only have four. From the anterior to posterior the layers of the human cornea are:

1. Corneal epithelium: an exceedingly thin multicellular epithelial tissue layer (non-keratinized stratified squamous epithelium) of fast-growing and easily regenerated cells, kept moist with tears. Irregularity or edema of the corneal epithelium disrupts the smoothness of the air/tear-film interface, the most significant component of the total refractive power of the eye, thereby reducing visual acuity. Corneal epithelium is continuous with the conjunctival epithelium, and is composed of about 6 layers of cells which are shed constantly on the exposed layer and are regenerated by multiplication in the basal layer.
2. Bowman's layer (also known as the anterior limiting membrane): when discussed in lieu of a subepithelial basement membrane, Bowman's Layer is a tough layer composed of collagen (mainly type I collagen fibrils), laminin, nidogen, perlecan and other HSPGs that protects the corneal stroma. When discussed as a separate entity from the subepithelial basement membrane, Bowman's Layer can be described as an acellular, condensed region of the apical stroma, composed primarily of randomly organized yet tightly woven collagen fibrils. These fibrils interact with and attach onto each other. This layer is eight to 14 micrometres (μm) thick and is absent or very thin in non-primates.
3. Corneal stroma (also substantia propria): a thick, transparent middle layer, consisting of regularly arranged collagen fibers along with sparsely distributed interconnected keratocytes, which are the cells for general repair and maintenance. They are parallel and are superimposed like book pages. The corneal stroma consists of approximately 200 layers of mainly type I collagen fibrils. Each layer is 1.5-2.5 μm. Up to 90% of the corneal thickness is composed of stroma. There are 2 theories of how transparency in the cornea comes about:
  1. The lattice arrangements of the collagen fibrils in the stroma. The light scatter by individual fibrils is cancelled by destructive interference from the scattered light from other individual fibrils.
  2. The spacing of the neighboring collagen fibrils in the stroma must be < 200 nm for there to be transparency. (Goldman and Benedek)
4. Descemet's membrane (also posterior limiting membrane): a thin acellular layer that serves as the modified basement membrane of the corneal endothelium, from which the cells are derived. This layer is composed mainly of collagen type IV fibrils, less rigid than collagen type I fibrils, and is around 5-20 μm thick, depending on the subject's age. Just anterior to Descemet's membrane, a very thin and strong layer, Dua's layer, 15 microns thick and able to withstand 1.5 to 2 bars of pressure.
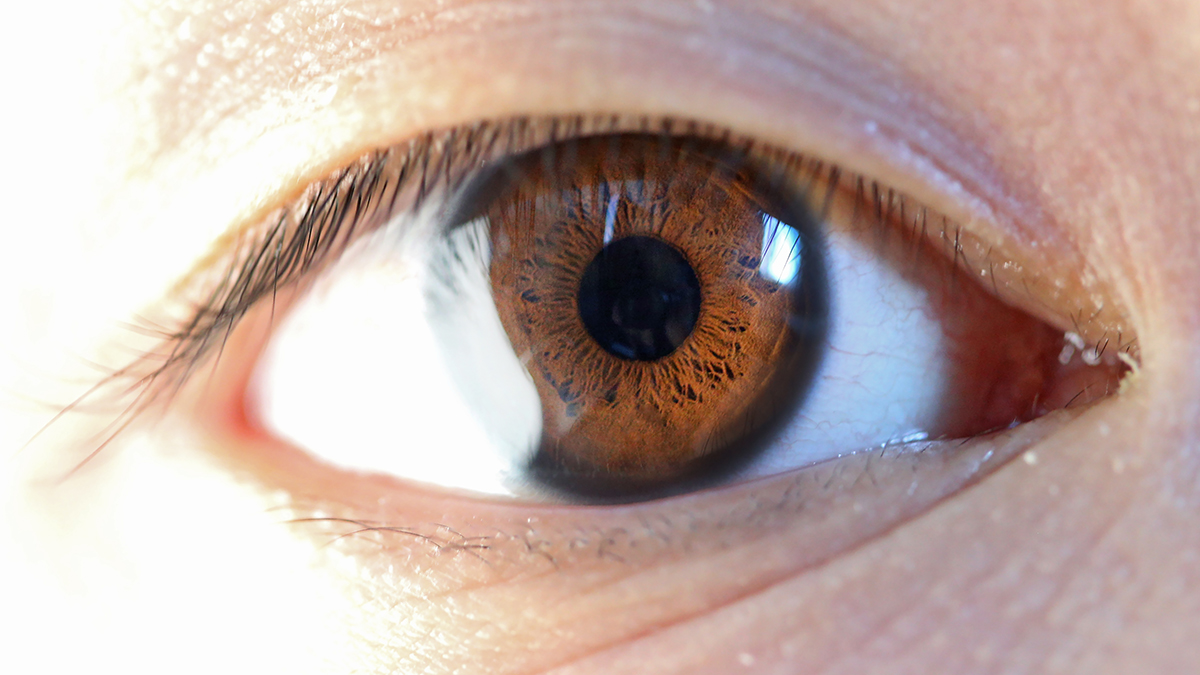
5. In a healthy eye, the cornea presents as a clear, domed, glossy covering over the iris and pupil.
  Corneal endothelium: a simple squamous or low cuboidal monolayer, approx 5 μm thick, of mitochondria-rich cells. These cells are responsible for regulating fluid and solute transport between the aqueous and corneal stromal compartments. (The term endothelium is a misnomer here. The corneal endothelium is bathed by aqueous humor, not by blood or lymph, and has a very different origin, function, and appearance from vascular endothelia.) Unlike the corneal epithelium, the cells of the endothelium do not regenerate. Instead, they stretch to compensate for dead cells which reduces the overall cell density of the endothelium, which affects fluid regulation. If the endothelium can no longer maintain a proper fluid balance, stromal swelling due to excess fluids and subsequent loss of transparency will occur and this may cause corneal edema and interference with the transparency of the cornea and thus impairing the image formed. Iris pigment cells deposited on the corneal endothelium can sometimes be washed into a distinct vertical pattern by the aqueous currents - this is known as Krukenberg's Spindle.

=== Nerve supply ===
The cornea is one of the most sensitive tissues of the body, as it is densely innervated with sensory nerve fibres via the ophthalmic division of the trigeminal nerve by way of 70–80 long ciliary nerves. Research suggests the density of pain receptors in the cornea is 300–600 times greater than skin and 20–40 times greater than dental pulp, making any injury to the structure excruciatingly painful.

The ciliary nerves run under the endothelium and exit the eye through holes in the sclera apart from the optic nerve (which transmits only optic signals). The nerves enter the cornea via three levels; scleral, episcleral and conjunctival. Most of the bundles give rise by subdivision to a network in the stroma, from which fibres supply the different regions. The three networks are, midstromal, subepithelial/sub-basal, and epithelial. The receptive fields of each nerve ending are very large, and may overlap.

Corneal nerves of the subepithelial layer terminate near the superficial epithelial layer of the cornea in a logarithmic spiral pattern. The density of epithelial nerves decreases with age, especially after the seventh decade.

== Function ==
=== Refraction ===
The optical component is concerned with producing a reduced inverted image on the retina. The eye's optical system consists of not only two but four surfaces—two on the cornea, two on the lens. Rays are refracted toward the midline. Distant rays, due to their parallel nature, converge to a point on the retina. The cornea admits light at the greatest angle. The aqueous and vitreous humors both have a refractive index of 1.336-1.339, whereas the cornea has a refractive index of 1.376. Because the change in refractive index between cornea and aqueous humor is relatively small compared to the change at the air–cornea interface, it has a negligible refractive effect, typically -6 dioptres. The cornea is considered to be a positive meniscus lens. Some species of birds and chameleons, and one known species of fish, also have corneas which can focus.

=== Transparency ===
The cornea becomes opaque after death (provenance: genus Bos)

Upon death or removal of an eye the cornea absorbs the aqueous humor, thickens, and becomes hazy. Transparency can be restored by putting it in a warm, well-ventilated chamber at 31 °C (88 °F, the normal temperature), allowing the fluid to leave the cornea and become transparent. The cornea takes in fluid from the aqueous humor and the small blood vessels of the limbus, but a pump ejects the fluid immediately upon entry. When energy is deficient the pump may fail, or function too slowly to compensate, leading to swelling. This arises at death, but a dead eye can be placed in a warm chamber with a reservoir of sugar and glycogen that generally keeps the cornea transparent for at least 24 hours.

The endothelium controls this pumping action, and as discussed above, damage thereof is more serious, and is a cause of opaqueness and swelling. When damage to the cornea occurs, such as in a viral infection, the collagen used to repair the process is not regularly arranged, leading to an opaque patch (leukoma).

== Clinical significance ==
The most common corneal disorders are the following:

- Corneal abrasion – a medical condition involving the loss of the surface epithelial layer of the eye's cornea as a result of trauma to the surface of the eye.
- Corneal dystrophy – a condition in which one or more parts of the cornea lose their normal clarity due to a buildup of cloudy material.
- Corneal ulcer – an inflammatory or infective condition of the cornea involving disruption of its epithelial layer with involvement of the corneal stroma.
- Corneal neovascularization – excessive ingrowth of blood vessels from the limbal vascular plexus into the cornea, caused by deprivation of oxygen from the air.
- Fuchs' dystrophy – cloudy morning vision.
- Keratitis – inflammation of the cornea.
- Keratoconus – a degenerative disease, the cornea thins and changes shape to be more like a cone.
- Corneal foreign body – a foreign object present in the cornea, one of the most common preventable occupational hazards.

=== Management ===
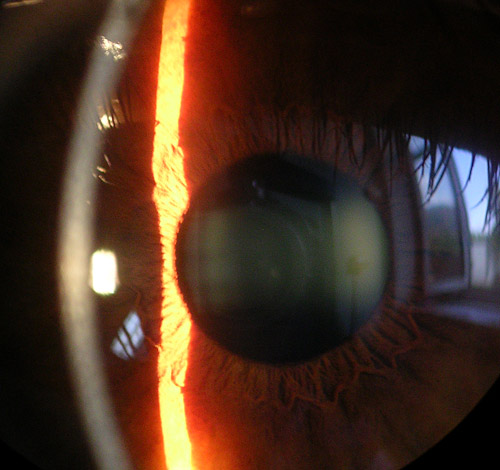
Slit lamp image of the cornea, iris and lens (showing mild cataract)

==== Surgical procedures ====
Various refractive eye surgery techniques change the shape of the cornea in order to reduce the need for corrective lenses or otherwise improve the refractive state of the eye. In many of the techniques used today, reshaping of the cornea is performed by photoablation using the excimer laser.

There are also synthetic corneas (keratoprostheses) in development. Most are merely plastic inserts, but there are also those composed of biocompatible synthetic materials that encourage tissue ingrowth into the synthetic cornea, thereby promoting biointegration. Other methods, such as magnetic deformable membranes and optically coherent transcranial magnetic stimulation of the human retina are still in very early stages of research.

==== Other procedures ====
Orthokeratology is a method using specialized hard or rigid gas-permeable contact lenses to transiently reshape the cornea in order to improve the refractive state of the eye or reduce the need for eyeglasses and contact lenses.

In 2009, researchers at the University of Pittsburgh Medical center demonstrated that stem cell collected from human corneas can restore transparency without provoking a rejection response in mice with corneal damage. For corneal epithelial diseases such as Stevens Johnson Syndrome, persistent corneal ulcer etc., the autologous contralateral (normal) suprabasal limbus derived in vitro expanded corneal limbal stem cells are found to be effective as amniotic membrane based expansion is controversial. For endothelial diseases, such as bullous keratopathy, cadaver corneal endothelial precursor cells have been proven to be efficient. Recently emerging tissue engineering technologies are expected to be capable of making one cadaver-donor's corneal cells be expanded and be usable in more than one patient's eye. One such technique has been reported to be safe and efficacious in a clinical pilot study with long term follow-up.

==== Corneal retention and permeability in topical drug delivery to the eye ====
The majority of ocular therapeutic agents are administered to the eye via the topical route. Cornea is one of the main barriers for drug diffusion because of its highly impermeable nature. Its continuous irrigation with a tear fluid also results in poor retention of the therapeutic agents on the ocular surface. Poor permeability of the cornea and quick wash out of therapeutic agents from ocular surface result in very low bioavailability of the drugs administered via topical route (typically less than 5%). Poor retention of formulations on ocular surfaces could potentially be improved with the use of mucoadhesive polymers. Drug permeability through the cornea could be facilitated with addition of penetration enhancers into topical formulations.

=== Transplantation ===
If the corneal stroma develops visually significant opacity, irregularity, or edema, a cornea of a deceased donor can be transplanted. Because there are no blood vessels in the cornea, there are also few problems with rejection of the new cornea.

When a cornea is needed for transplant, as from an eye bank, the best procedure is to remove the cornea from the eyeball, preventing the cornea from absorbing the aqueous humor.

There is a global shortage of corneal donations, severely limiting the availability of corneal transplants across most of the world. A 2016 study found that 12.7 million visually impaired people were in need of a corneal transplant, with only 1 cornea available for every 70 needed. Many countries have years-long waitlists for corneal transplant surgery due to the shortage of donated corneas. Only a handful of countries consistently have a large enough supply of donated corneas to meet local demand without a waitlist, including the United States, Italy, and Sri Lanka.

== See also ==
- Corneal pachymetry
- Corneal reflex
- Corneal tattooing
- Corneal topography
- Eye disease
- Keratometry
- List of keratins expressed in the human integumentary system
