= Descemet's membrane =

Membrane in the cornea of the eye

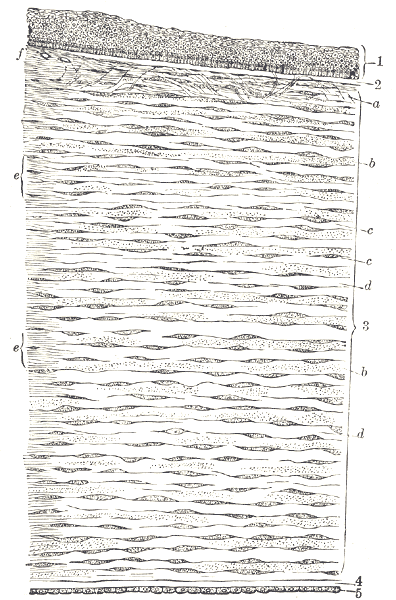
- Vertical section of human cornea from near the margin. (Waldeyer.) Magnified.: 1. Epithelium; 2. Anterior elastic lamina 3. substantia propria 4. Posterior elastic lamina. (Descemet's membrane); 5. Endothelium of the anterior chamber; 1. Oblique fibers in the anterior layer of the substantia propria 2. Lamellae, the fibers of which are cut across, producing a dotted appearance 3. Corneal corpuscles appearing fusiform in section 4. Lamellae, the fibers of which are cut longitudinally 5. Transition to the sclera, with more distinct fibrillation, and surmounted by a thicker epithelium 6. Small blood vessels cut across near the margin of the cornea

Details
- Pronunciation: English: /ˈdɛsəmeɪ/
- Location: Cornea of eye

Identifiers
- Latin: l. limitans posterior corneae
- MeSH: D003886
- TA98: A15.2.02.021
- FMA: 58309

Descemet's membrane (or the Descemet membrane) is the basement membrane that lies between the corneal proper substance, also called stroma, and the endothelial layer of the cornea. It is composed of different kinds of collagen (Type IV and VIII) than the stroma. The endothelial layer is located at the posterior of the cornea. Descemet's membrane, as the basement membrane for the endothelial layer, is secreted by the single layer of squamous epithelial cells that compose the endothelial layer of the cornea.

== Structure ==
Its thickness ranges from 3 μm at birth to 8–10 μm in adults.

The corneal endothelium is a single layer of squamous cells covering the surface of the cornea that faces the anterior chamber.

== Clinical significance ==
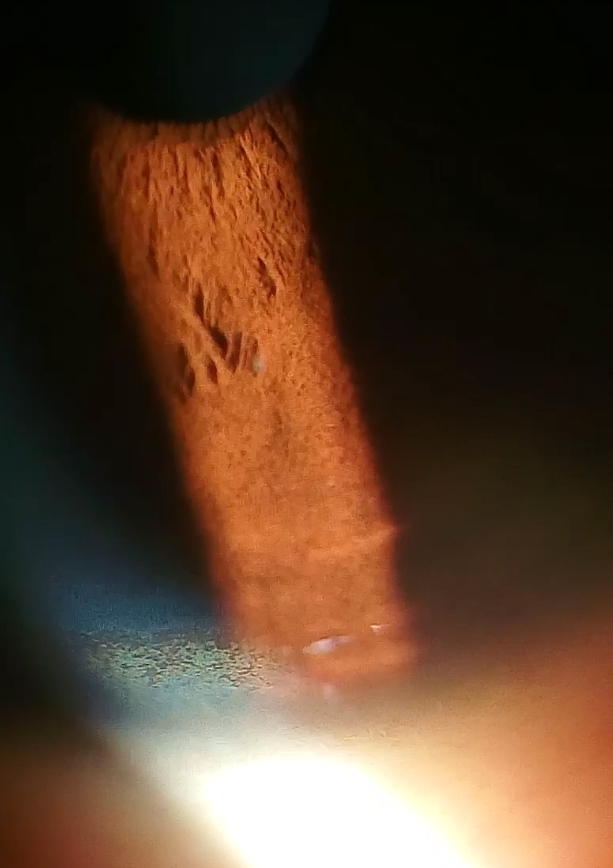
Copper disposition on corneal Descemet's membrane

Significant damage to the membrane may require a corneal transplant. Damage caused by the hereditary condition known as Fuchs dystrophy (q.v.)—where Descemet's membrane progressively fails and the cornea thickens and clouds because the exchange of nutrients/fluids between the cornea and the rest of the eye is interrupted—can be reversed by surgery. The surgeon can scrape away the damaged Descemet membrane and insert/transplant a new membrane harvested from the eye of a donor. In the process most of the squamous cells of the donor membrane survive to dramatically and emphatically reverse the corneal deterioration (see DMEK surgery).

Descemet's membrane is also a site of copper deposition in patients with Wilson's disease or other liver diseases, leading to formation of Kayser–Fleischer rings.

== History ==
It is also known as the posterior limiting elastic lamina, lamina elastica posterior, and membrane of Demours. It was named after French physician Jean Descemet (1732–1810).

== See also ==
- Haab's striae
- Kayser–Fleischer ring
- Pierre Demours
