= Corneal opacity =

- Other names: Corneal scarring
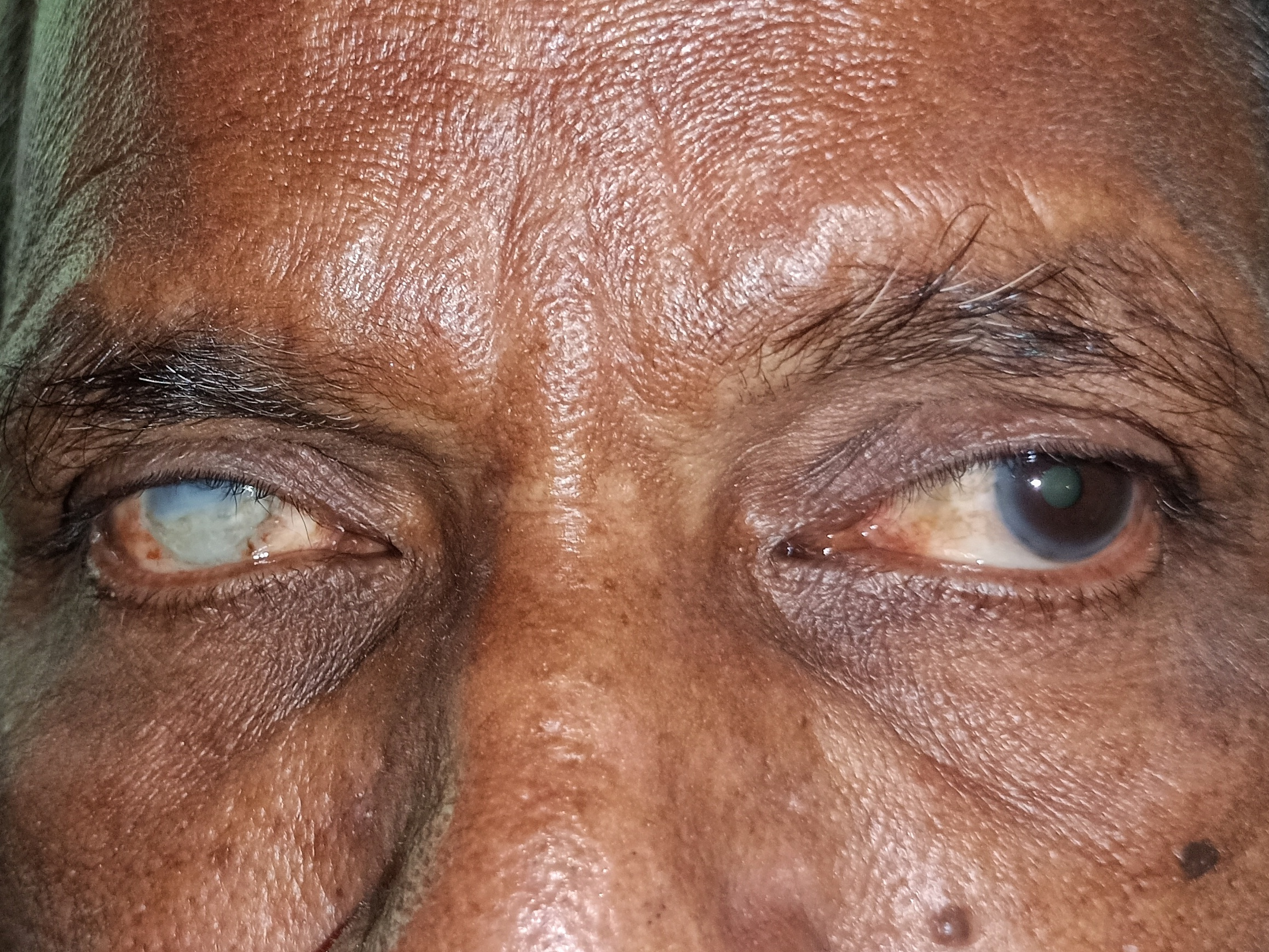
- Complete corneal opacity in right eye with normal left eye
- Specialty: Ophthalmology
- Symptoms: Loss of vision
- Complications: Blindness
- Usual onset: Congenital or acquired
- Treatment: Corneal transplantation
- Frequency: 4th main cause of blindness globally (5.1%).

Corneal opacification is a term used when the cornea of the eye loses its transparency. The term corneal opacity is used particularly for the loss of transparency of cornea due to scarring. Transparency of the cornea is dependent on the uniform diameter and the regular spacing and arrangement of the collagen fibrils within the stroma. Alterations in the spacing of collagen fibrils in a variety of conditions including corneal edema, scars, and macular corneal dystrophy is clinically manifested as corneal opacity. The term corneal blindness is commonly used to describe blindness due to corneal opacity.

Keratoplasty also known as corneal transplantation is the main treatment option for visual improvement in corneal opacity. Other treatments which may improve visual outcome includes optical iridectomy, phototherapeutic keratectomy and keratoprosthesises. Corneal tattooing may be used for improving the cosmetic appearance of the opaque eye.

== Types ==
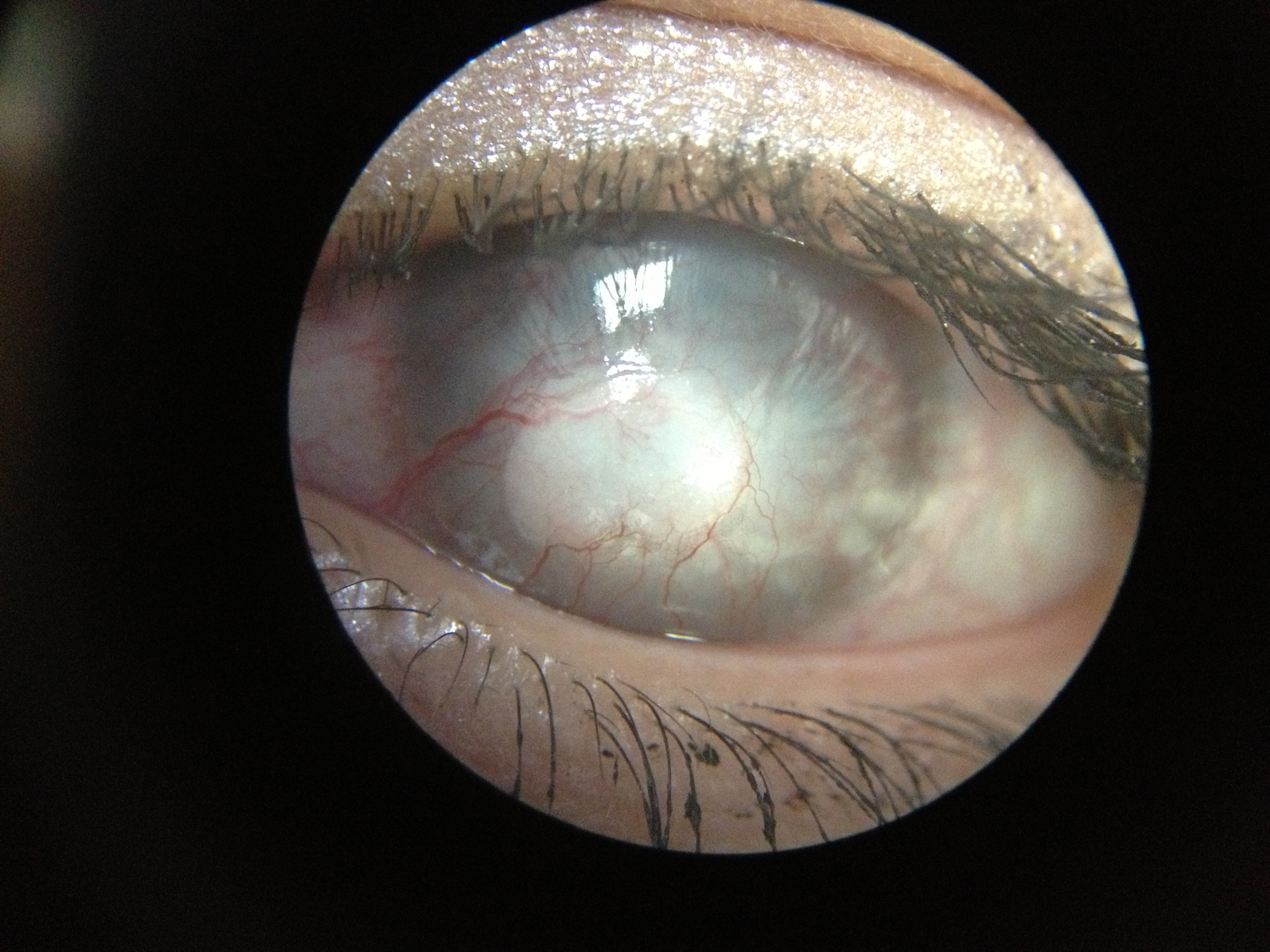
Corneal opacity with neovascularization

Depending on the density, corneal opacity is graded as nebular, macular and leucomatous.

=== Nebular corneal opacity ===
Nebular corneal opacity is a faint opacity which results due to superficial scars involving Bowman's layer and superficial stroma. A nebular corneal opacity allows the details of the iris to be seen through the opacity. A thin, diffuse nebula covering the pupillary area interferes more with vision than a strictly localized dense leucoma, so long as the latter does not block the whole pupillary area. This is because the leucoma stops all the light which falls upon it, whereas the nebula refracts it irregularly, allowing many of the rays to fall upon the retina where they blur the image formed by the regularly refracted rays.

=== Macular corneal opacity ===
Macular corneal opacity is a semidense opacity produced when scarring involves about half the corneal stroma.

=== Leucomatous corneal opacity (leucoma simplex) ===
Leucomatous corneal opacity is a dense white opacity which results due to scarring of more than half of the stroma. A number of different presentations of leucomatous corneal opacity exist:

- Adherent leucoma: results when healing occurs after perforation of cornea with incarceration of iris. The iris is adherent to the back of a leucomatous cornea. One of the major complication of adherent leucoma is Secondary glaucoma
- Corneoiridic scar: if iris tissue is incarcerated and incorporated within the scar tissue, as occurs in healing of a large sloughed corneal ulcer, it is called a corneoiridic scar.
- Corneal facet: corneal surface depressed at the site of healing (due to less fibrous tissue); such a scar is called facet.
- Kerectasia: In this condition, corneal curvature is increased at the site of opacity (bulge due to weak scar).

== Presentation ==
Signs and symptoms include the following:

- Loss of vision or blindness (when dense opacity covers the pupillary area)
- Blurred vision (due to astigmatic effect and light scattering)
- Glare

=== Complications ===
Congenital corneal opacity that affecting vision will cause amblyopia. That type of amblyopia is known as form-deprivation amblyopia (or amblyopia ex anopsia).

=== Secondary changes in corneal opacity ===
Secondary changes may be seen in long-standing cases include: hyaline degeneration, calcareous degeneration, pigmentation and atheromatous ulceration.

== Causes ==
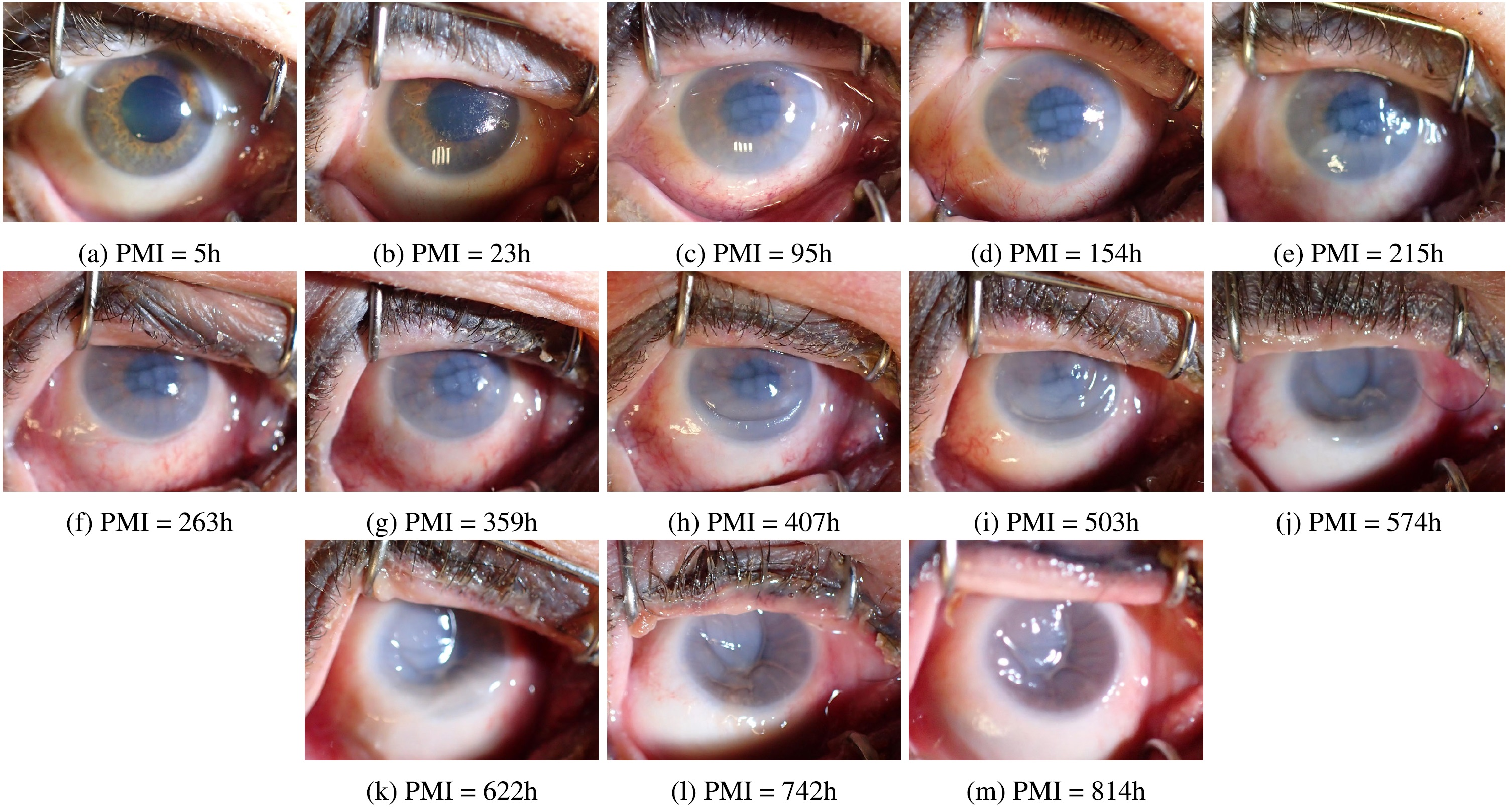
Corneal opacity or "clouding" also gradually appears after death, and can be used to estimate the postmortem interval (PMI).

- Congenital opacities may occur as developmental anomalies or following birth trauma. Causes of congenital corneal opacities include sclerocornea, trauma, ulcer, mucopolysaccharidosis, Peter's anomaly, congenital hereditary endothelial dystrophy.
- Ocular trauma
- Corneal ulceration
- Xerophthalmia, caused by Vitamin A deficiency
- Trachoma
- Onchocerciasis
- Mucous membrane pemphigoid: Ocular form of mucous membrane pemphigoid may cause corneal opacity and loss of vision.
- Death

== Genetics ==
Pediatric corneal opacities may be congenital or acquired.

=== Congenital corneal opacities ===
Congenital reasons for this condition include:

- Congenital hereditary endothelial dystrophy (CHED): There are 2 forms of congenital hereditary endothelial dystrophy (CHED). Commonest is an autosomal recessive form, which is present at birth, but nonprogressive. Nystagmus is seen in association with this form. Another is an autosomal dominant form that occurs within the first few years of life. This form is progressive, but nystagmus is not seen. Deafness and CHED are seen in Harboyan syndrome. The histologic findings are very similar to those seen in pseudophakic/ aphakic bullous keratopathy. The appearance of the cornea is similar to that in congenital glaucoma but without increased corneal diameter and elevated intraocular pressure.
- Posterior polymorphous corneal dystrophy (PPMD, PPCD): PPCD, also known as Schlichting dystrophy, is an autosomal dominant disorder of the corneal endothelium and Descemet's membrane. It is usually present in the second or third decade of life. It has the same entity as the first form of CHED. Most cases of PPMD are asymptomatic, and these cases generally do not require treatment. PPMD patients with bilateral, corneal opacities that can affect vision, descemet's membrane endothelial keratoplasty or penetrating keratoplasty are the treatments of choice to improve vision and to avoid amblyopia.
- Congenital hereditary stromal dystrophy (CHSD): CHSD is also known as Congenital stromal corneal dystrophy or Congenital stromal dystrophy of the cornea. It is a rare autosomal dominant disease caused by mutations in the DCN gene. In this bilateral Snowflake, whitish opacities appear throughout the cornea. The stromal lamellae are abnormal and may be separated by amorphous deposits. Moderate to severe vision loss may occur due to corneal opacity. In case of severe vision loss, treatment of choice is penetrating keratoplasty.
- Peters anomaly: Peters anomaly, also known as iridocorneal adhesions or keratolenticular adhesions, is a posterior corneal defect with an overlying stromal opacity, often accompanied by adherent iris strands (Peters anomaly type 1). The size and density of the opacity can range from a mild to dense central leukoma.
- Congenital anterior staphyloma: Congenital anterior staphyloma is a rare form of anterior segment dysgenesis that shares similarities with Peters anomaly. It is characterized by an ectatic protrusion of a central opacified cornea lined by uveal tissue. The protrusion extends beyond the plane of the eyelid margins and it can be unilateral or bilateral.
- Lattice corneal dystrophy: Lattice corneal dystrophy is an autosomal-dominant characterized by amyloid deposition in the corneal stroma. Due to deposits, lattice-like corneal opacities may occur in stroma. Three types of dystrophies are there, type 1, type 2 and type 3. Type 1 is also known as Biber-Haab-Dimmer corneal dystrophy, TGFBI type Lattice Dystrophy, or Classic Lattice Dystrophy. LCD type II is not included in corneal dystrophies.
- Granular corneal dystrophy: Two types, Type 1 and Type 2 are there. Both have autosomal dominant inheritance. In Type 1, Discrete crumb-like opacities are seen in the central anterior stroma. Visual symptoms such as glare and photophobia may occur early in life. In Type 2, deposits begin to appear in early childhood or adolescence as tiny whitish dots in the anterior stroma. Larger stellate, ring, or snowflake opacities may occur in later stages. Decrease in vision starts earlier in type2 than type1.
- Sclerocornea: Sclerocornea is a congenital disorder in which the cornea is opaque and resembles the sclera, making the limbus indistinct. The central cornea is clearer than the periphery.
- Cystinosis: Cystinosis is a rare autosomal recessive metabolic disease characterized by elevated levels of cystine within the cell. Early deposition of cystine crystals in the cornea cause tinsel-like corneal opacities.
- Ichthyosis: X-linked ichthyosis is a genetic skin disorder caused by the hereditary deficiency of the steroid sulfatase enzyme. Ocular manifestations of XLI include superficial or deep corneal opacities.
- Trisomy 8 mosaicism (T8M): It is a rare chromosome disorder caused by the presence of an extra chromosome 8 in some cells of the body. Dense corneal opacities may occur in trisomy 8 mosaicism.
- Farber's disease: Nodular corneal opacity may be seen in association with this rare autosomal recessive disease.

=== Acquired pediatric corneal opacities ===
Acquired reasons for this condition include:

- Traumatic: Traumatic breaks in Descemet membrane may cause corneal opacity. Injuries to Descemet membrane occur during delivery. Opacity is commonly unilateral.
- Congenital or infantile glaucoma: In Congenital glaucoma, the cornea becomes edematous, cloudy, and enlarged. Treatment should be done to reduce Intraocular pressure.
- Congenital corneal ulcers: Unilateral corneal opacity may occur in association with conjunctival injection and other signs of inflammation.
- Mucopolysaccharidoses: The mucopolysaccharidoses are a group of inherited metabolic diseases caused by the absence or malfunctioning of certain enzymes the body needs to break down molecules called glycosaminoglycans. It is an autosomal recessive disorder. Sometimes, Corneal haze may be present in early life. Treatment options for significant opacities include penetrating keratoplasty and DALK.

== Treatment ==
=== Keratoplasty ===
Keratoplasty also known as corneal transplantation is the main treatment option for visual improvement in corneal opacity. In this, the opaque cornea is replaced with donor tissue. Depending on type and density of corneal opacity different types of keratoplasty may be used such as:

- Penetrating keratoplasty: It is the traditional full thickness corneal transplant procedure, in which trephine (a circular cutting device) is used to cut opaque cornea, a similar-sized portion of the donor cornea is removed with a second trephine. The removed part of donor cornea is known as corneal button. The donor tissue is then sutured to the patient eye. Dense corneal opacity which occupies all the corneal layers may be treated with penetrating keratoplasty.
- Superficial lamellar keratoplasty: Superficial lamellar keratoplasty is used to treat superficial corneal opacities, which occupies superficial one third part of stroma. In this technique, the opaque part of the cornea is removed and replaced with donor tissue, leaving healthy part of the cornea including deeper parts of stroma and endothelium.
- Deep anterior lamellar keratoplasty: DALK may be considered in deep opacities with normal endothelium and descemet's membrane. In this procedure, the anterior layers of cornea are removed and replaced with donor tissue, leaving the endothelial layer and the descemet's membrane in place.

=== Optical iridectomy ===
Optical iridectomy creates a clear entrance pupil, improving vision in patients with segmental corneal opacities. An area of clear peripheral cornea can produce retinal images compatible with good visual acuity.

=== Phototherapeutic keratectomy (PTK) ===
Excimer laser phototherapeutic keratectomy (PTK) is useful in superficial (nebular) corneal opacities.

=== Tattooing of scar ===
Keratopigmentation or corneal tattooing is a procedure used for centuries to improve the cosmetic appearance of corneal scars. Tattooing will not improve vision. For tattooing procedure Indian black ink, gold or platinum may be used.

==== Techniques ====
- Staining method: In this technique, tattoo ink is directly applied to anterior surface of cornea. Benefits of this procedure include fast procedure with uniform dye application. Risk of fading is a main drawback.
- Femtosecond laser-assisted corneal tattooing: Femtosecond laser-assisted corneal tattooing is a new corneal tattooing technique, with many benefits.

=== Keratoprosthesis ===
Keratoprosthesis is a surgical procedure where damaged or opaque cornea is replaced with an artificial cornea. Artificial corneas currently in commercial use include Boston keratoprosthesis, Osteo-Odonto-Keratoprosthesis (OOKP), AlphaCor, KeraKlear Artificial Cornea etc.

== Epidemiology ==
Corneal opacity is the 4th main cause of blindness globally (5.1%).

=== Europe ===
The prevalence of congenital corneal opacities (CCO) is estimated to be 3 in 100,000 newborns. This number increases to 6 in 100,000 if congenital glaucoma patients are included. A study of live births in Spain reported that corneal opacities accounted for 3.11% of congenital eye malformations (Bermejo et al, 1998). About 4% of keratoplasties done in the pediatric population in Denmark are due to congenital anomalies (Hovlykke et al, 2014).

=== India ===
In NPCB survey (2001–2002) Corneal opacity was the 6th major cause of blindness in India, which accounts for 0.9% of total blind population. In the RAAB (Rapid Assessment of Avoidable Blindness) survey (2006–2007) Corneal opacity including Trachoma was mentioned as the second major cause of blindness, which accounts for 6.5% of total blindness.

== See also ==
- Corneal transplantation
- Corneal ulcer
- Corneal button
