= Tissue transplantation =

Tissue transplantation is a surgical procedure involving the removal of tissue from a donor site or the creation of new tissue, followed by tissue transfer to the recipient site. The aim of tissue transplantation is to repair or replace tissues that are missing, damaged, or diseased, thereby improving patients' survival, functionality and quality of life.

The practice of tissue transplantation dates back to 1600 BC and has undergone vast advancements since then. The four main types of tissue transplantation are xenotransplantation, allotransplantation, isotransplantation and autotransplantation, while the common tissues transplanted include skin, bone, corneal and vessel grafts.

Tissue transplantation comes with risks and complications, including immune rejection and viral infections. Other than concerns about medical risks, medical ethics are also key factors for consideration during tissue transplantation.

Further research in tissue engineering, regenerative medicine, immunosuppressants and gene editing holds the potential to enhance the efficiency and outcome of tissue transplantation.

== History ==
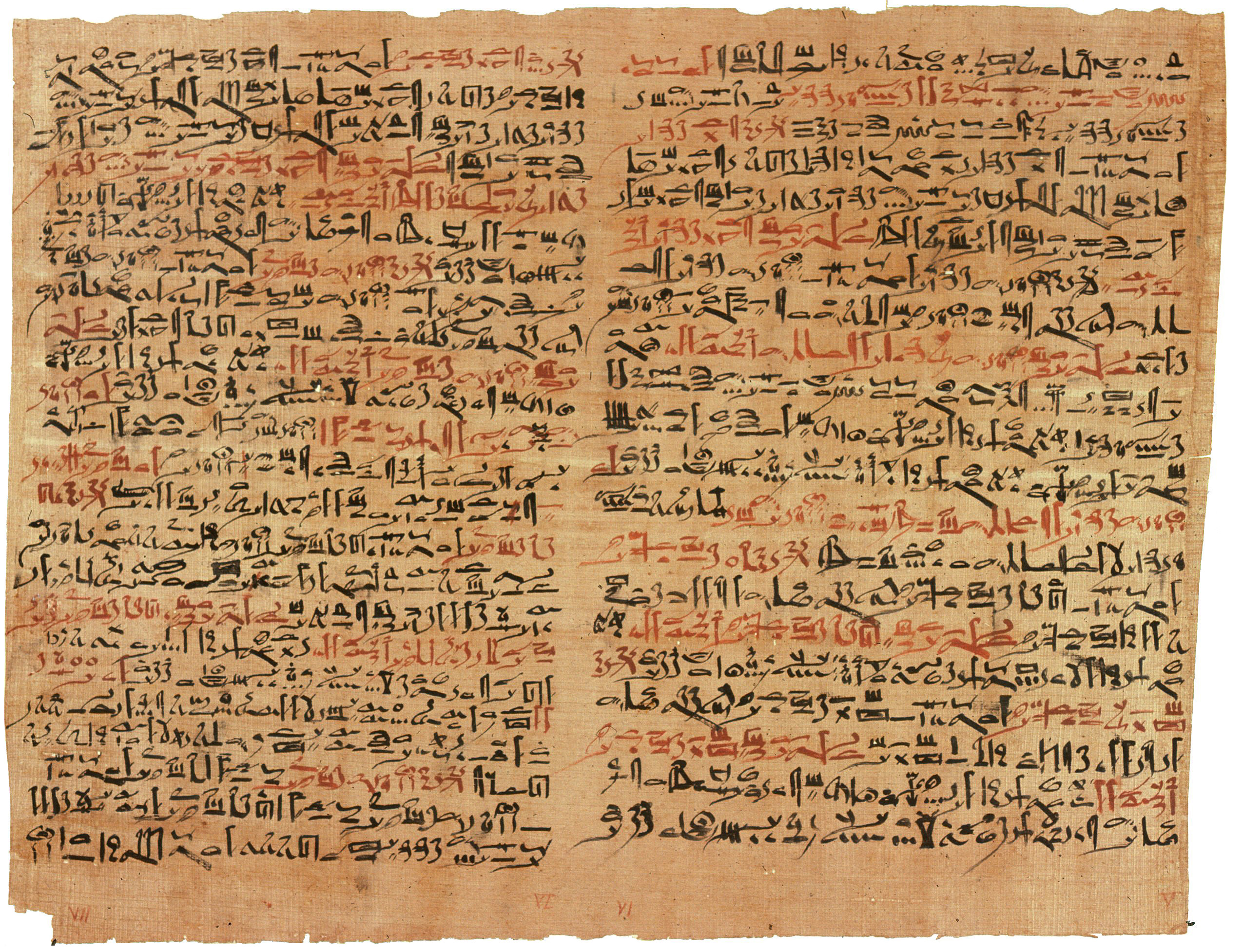
The Edwin Smith papyrus, containing the earliest surgical records of tissue transplantation

The earliest record of tissue transplantation can be traced back to the Edwin Smith Papyrus, a surgical document dating back to around 1600 BC. Skin grafting techniques to treat injuries were mentioned in this ancient text.

The first officially documented tissue transplant is a skin transplant from 1869, performed by Swiss surgeon Jacques-Louis Reverdin. Reverdin's technique involved transplanting tiny and thin portions of skin called "epidemic grafts" onto patients' wounds, which resulted in successful epidermal proliferation. This paved the way for subsequent advancements in skin grafting, such as the first successful skin grafting surgery to treat burns by British surgeon George Davis Pollock in 1870.

Tissue transplantation has undergone drastic advancements since the discovery of adaptive immunity for tissue rejection by Brazilian-British biologist Peter Medawar in the 1950s. This has led to the development of immunosuppressive drugs, such as Azathioprine (Imuran), which has been widely used in tissue transplantation since the 1960s. Together with improvements in transplantation practices, such as tissue typing, success rates of tissue transplantation rose.

== Types ==
=== Xenotransplantation ===
Xenotransplantation is a cross-species tissue transplantation from animal to human. The development of blood vessel anastomosis opened the door for xenotransplantation during the 20th century, which led to numerous attempts in organ transplantations with tissues from nonhuman primates (NHPs). This is due to the pathobiological barriers between species, including the activation of innate and adaptive immune systems, coagulation dysregulation, inflammation and profound toxicity. As genetic modification technology matures, genetically modified pigs have slowly been made to bridge the genetic incompatibility arising from xenotransplantation. This is achieved by modifying the porcine cell gene to synthesize human complement-regulatory proteins.

=== Allotransplantation ===
Allotransplantation refers to tissue transplant between individuals with different genetic makeup. Although the genetic composition variation in allografts is not as large as that in xenografts, the rejection rate remains high. To minimize rejection, cautious donor-recipient matching is needed. This includes tissue typing, which is the crossmatching of donor and recipient through matching human leukocyte antigens (HLA) and ABO blood antigens. Additional measures like screening donors for any diseases like AIDS, hepatitis B, hepatitis C and syphilis before extracting the tissues are done to further ensure the recipients' safety.

=== Isotransplantation ===
Isotransplantation refers to tissue transplants between individuals with the same genetic makeup. An example of isotransplantation would be the transplantation of tissues between identical twins, which are twins who share the same genetic composition. This is shown in the first successful living donor kidney transplantation procedure performed by Dr. Joseph E. Murray in 1954 between identical twins. Given the unique nature of this type of transplantation, there will be little to no chance of rejection due to the sharing of the same genetic materials. Hence, immunosuppressants would be unnecessary.

=== Autotransplantation ===
Autotransplantation refers to tissue transplantation from one part of the body to another. This type of transplantation is usually performed when one part of the body needs the tissue urgently. Hence, similar tissue from another part of the body that is in excess is sourced as the autograft. This can be seen in procedures like autologous orthopedic transplant, which remains the "gold standard" of bone grafting methods through extracting grafts from places like the iliac crest and transplanting them to the targeted fracture spot. Since the tissue is transplanted from one part of the body to another part with the same genetic composition, rejection is implausible.

== Common types of tissues ==
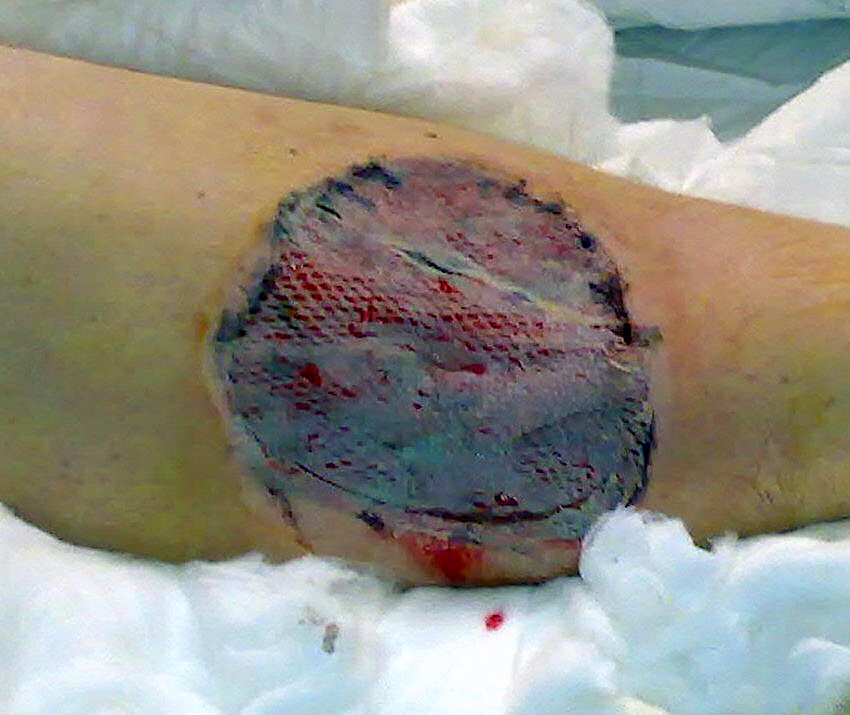
A skin graft over a wound

=== Skin grafts ===
Skin grafts are used to treat wounds and burns. Autologous full-thickness grafts involving transplantation of the entire epidermis and dermis to provide better cosmetic outcomes can be used for smaller wounds. As for larger wounds, autologous split-thickness grafts involving transplantation of the epidermis and partial portion of the dermis are used. More extensive wounds or burns would typically require allografts sourced from cadavers. Artificial skin can also be used in treating serious burns or chronic skin wounds.

An animation showing the iliac crest (the red areas)

=== Bone grafts ===
Bone grafts repair damaged bones or help heal fractures. Autograft tissues are commonly obtained from the posterior iliac crest due to their high osteogenic potential and ability to supply both cancellous and cortical bones. Autografts are preferred as they possess osteoconductive scaffolds, osteoinductive signaling molecules and osteogenic cells, meaning they provide scaffolds for bone growth, stimulate bone growth and generate bone cells, while allografts only possess osteoconductive properties. Synthetic grafts include the use of substances like hydroxyapatite and calcium phosphate derivatives.

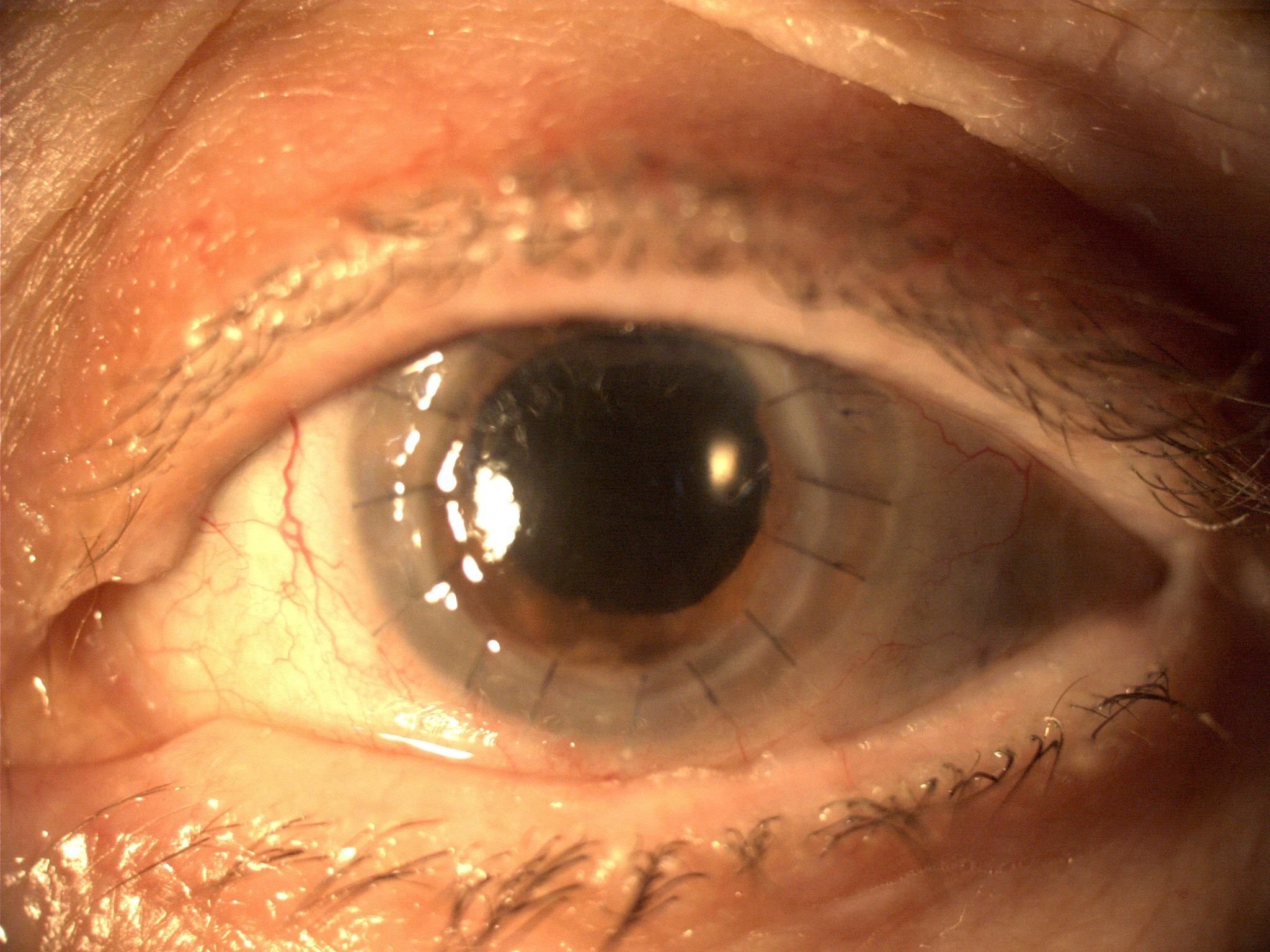
An eye that has undergone penetrating keratoplasty.

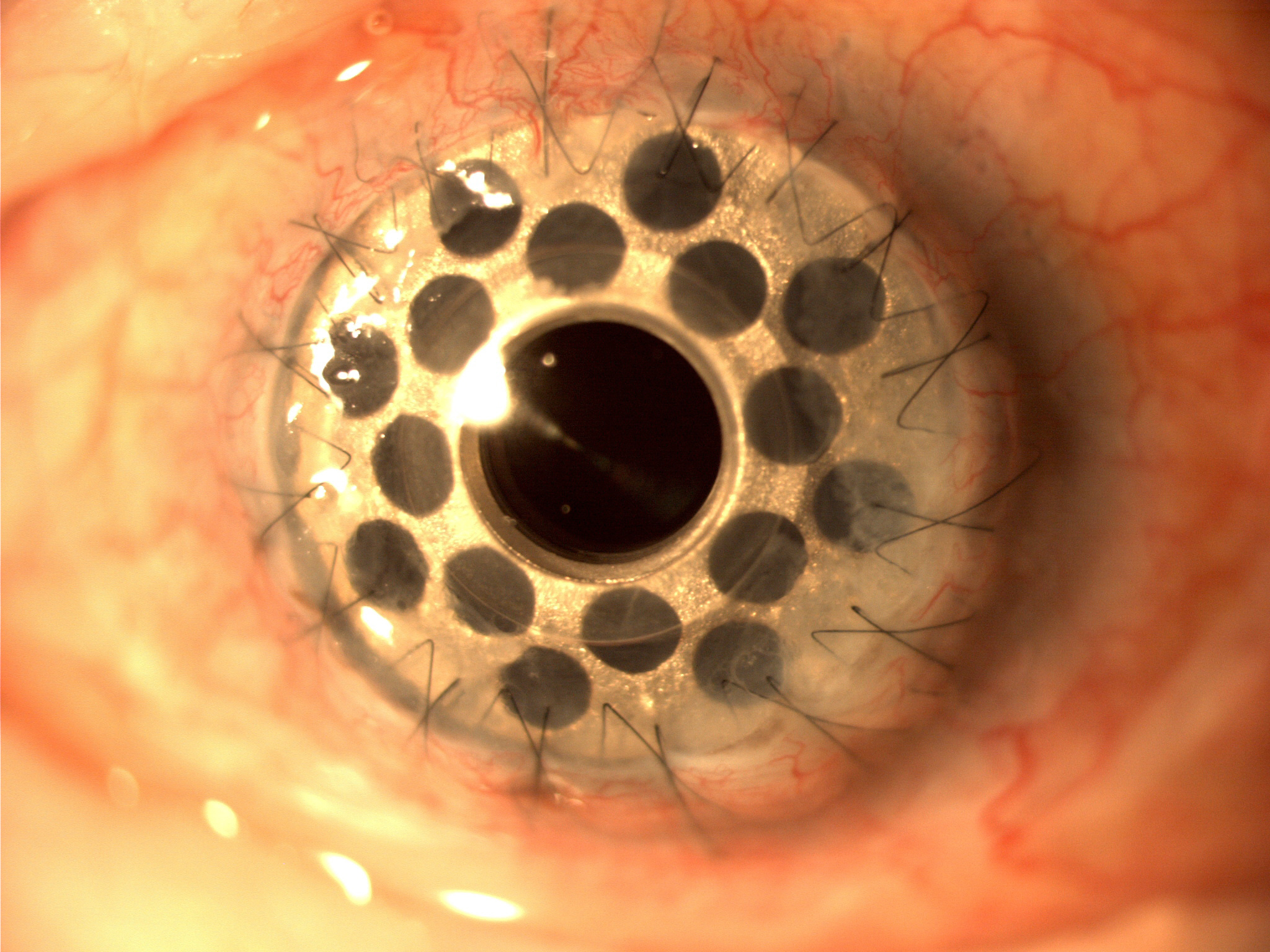
An eye that has undergone Boston keratoprosthesis.

=== Corneal grafts ===
Corneal grafts from allografts help restore vision, relieve pain or improve appearance in patients with corneal disease or damage. The three main types of corneal transplantation include penetrating keratoplasty involving transplantation of the whole cornea with a corneal button, lamellar keratoplasty involving replacement of the outer and middle corneal layers, and endothelial keratoplasty involving replacement of the inner layer of the cornea. Artificial corneal transplants, also known as keratoprosthesis, have been getting increasingly advanced and popular over the past decade, with Boston keratoprosthesis and Osteo-odonto-keratoprosthesis being the most commonly performed transplants.

=== Vascular grafts ===
Vascular grafts are used to replace or bypass damaged or occluded vessels. For small-diameter vessels (<6mm), autologous vessels usually involve the harvesting of the saphenous vein or the femoral artery. However, due to the limited vessel availability and the invasiveness of vessel harvesting, cryopreserved vessel allografts from deceased donors are used. Synthetic vascular grafts that are clinically approved include polyurethane, expanded polytetrafluoroethylene and PET (Dacron®).

Other types of tissues transplanted include cartilage, adrenal tissue, bone marrow, heart valve and composite transplantation of facial tissues.

== Risk and complications ==
Immune rejection is the main barrier that impedes success achieved via tissue transplantation. It can be categorized into three stages: hyperacute, acute and chronic rejection. Hyperacute rejection arises within 24 hours after the transplantation, and is characterized by a violent immune reaction that destroys grafts within hours after transplantation. Acute rejection arises within the first week to 6 months after transplantation and could be further categorised into acute humoral rejection or acute cellular rejection. Chronic rejection is the loss of graft function due to sustained immune response against the graft, leading to the functional loss of tissue graft from months to years.

One standard method for treating the complications that arise from immune rejection is using immunosuppressive drugs.

== Medical ethics ==
Medical ethics is of huge importance in tissue transplantation and is built upon the four pillars of autonomy, beneficence, non-maleficence and justice.

Autonomy pertains to the rights of both donors and recipients. No matter living or deceased, autonomous consent to tissue extraction should be obtained from the donor, in which the donor should be fully informed, mentally competent and acting voluntarily when providing consent. With tissue shortage, some countries such as France, Italy, Russia and Singapore have adopted the opt-out system, under which all adults are presumed to have consented to tissue donation after death unless opted out. For the recipients, they should also be fully informed about the benefits and risks of the tissue transplantation procedures.

Under the dual principles of beneficence and non-maleficence, tissue transplantation procedures should maximize the benefits while minimizing potential harm to both the donor and recipient. This includes proper assessment of the urgency of tissue transplant and careful matching of the donor and the recipient.

Justice in tissue transplantation involves ensuring equitable access to transplantation for all. Allocation systems which vary between countries are put in place to ensure the ethical distribution of tissues with considerations such as recipients' medical urgency and waiting time. Comprehensive guidelines are also put in place to ensure the ethical use of biotechnology in tissue transplantation.

== Future directions ==
Tissue engineering, like 3D bioprinting, is an emerging field of study about constructing tissue-like structures by precisely layering cells, growth factors and biomaterials. This field could revolutionize tissue transplants by synthesizing personalized grafts for enhanced integration without immune rejection and reducing reliance on donors.

A diagram of stem cell differentiation, showing the potential of stem cells in creating personalised tissues of various body parts for transplantation

The field of regenerative medicine, specifically stem cell therapy, also holds immense potential for tissue transplantation. The use of human pluripotent stem cells, specifically induced pluripotent stem cells, offers the cultivation of personalized tissues that minimize rejection risks. Moreover, they enable direct tissue repair within the body, potentially sidestepping the need for surgery and reducing infection risks.

Other directions include the advancements in immunosuppressive medication, which aims to reduce the side effects of immunosuppressive drugs, as well as gene editing, which aims to increase the integrability of animal tissues into humans.

While the above prospects hold tremendous potential, they are still in preclinical stages, with various obstacles, such as ethical issues and safety, that have yet to be addressed.
