= Hudson Silva =

Deshabandu Dr F. G. Hudson Silva
- Born: 1929; Colombo Sri Lanka
- Died: 1999 (aged 69–70)
- Education: Nalanda College Colombo
- Occupation: Eye Surgeon
- Known for: International Eye Bank

Deshabandu Dr F. G. Hudson Silva was the founder and president of the International Eye Bank, Tissue Bank, and the Sri Lanka Eye Donation Society. He was an honorary Fellow of the College of Ophthalmologists of Sri Lanka.

== Early life and education ==
Hudson was educated at Nalanda College, Colombo.

== Medical Student and campaign to collect corneas ==
In 1958 as a medical student, he launched his campaign to collect corneas. He received his first set of corneas in 1959, storing them in his home refrigerator at Wijerama Mawatha in Colombo. With the help of his wife Iranganie (née de Silva Kularatne), Silva established the Sri Lanka Eye Donation Society in 1961. He pursued his campaign and succeeded in persuading the majority Buddhist population of Sri Lanka that the donation of eyes after death was a meritorious act. As the campaign gathered momentum, thousands signed up to donate their eyes, and the membership of the Eye Donation Society grew rapidly, with branch societies springing up throughout the country.

== Eye donation ==
On 25 May 1964, Vesak Day, the first set of eyes was sent to Singapore.

Since its founding, the Sri Lanka Eye Donation Society has gifted over 100,000 corneas to restore the sight of the blind in Sri Lanka and 62 other countries. Silva has been honored by the people and heads of many countries with honorary titles and awards.

An eye hospital in Pakistan has been named after him (Hudson Silva Lions Eye Hospital, Gulberg, Lahore). His successful campaign has been featured in many international newspapers and magazines and the Reader's Digest has published several articles about him.

The Human Tissue Act passed by the Sri Lanka parliament in 1987 enabled Silva to establish the Model Human Tissue Bank in Colombo, Sri Lanka. Now in addition to eyes, Sri Lanka also donates human tissue to the world.

On 22 October 1999, Silva died in Colombo, Sri Lanka.
