= List of research institutes in Seattle =

Research institutes in Seattle include universities, corporations, nonprofit organizations, and other research groups doing research in Seattle.

== Health, medicine, and biomedical research ==
- Allen Institute for Brain Science
- Bill & Melinda Gates Foundation
- Center for Global Infectious Disease Research (formerly known as Seattle Biomedical Research Institute or SBRI)
- Fred Hutchinson Cancer Research Center
- Infectious Disease Research Institute
- Institute for Systems Biology
- Northeastern University - Seattle Campus
- Pacific Northwest Research Institute
- PATH
- Seattle Children's Research Institute
- SightLife
- University of Washington Department of Global Health
- Washington State University School for Global Animal Health
- Washington Biotechnology & Biomedical Association
- World Vision

=== Global health ===
- American Leprosy Missions
- Battelle Health & Life Sciences
- Big Water Consulting
- The Carter Center
- Cascade Designs, Inc.
- Days for Girls
- Friends of Chidamoyo
- The Geneva Foundation
- Global Health Technologies Coalition
- Global Impact
- Global Washington
- Islamic Relief US
- MAP International
- Med25 International
- Medical Teams International
- Northwest Association for Biomedical Researchers
- One By One
- Open Arms Perinatal Services
- Pacific Northwest Diabetes Research Institute
- Planned Parenthood of the Great Northwest
- Peace Health
- Project Concern International
- SCOPE
- Seattle Cancer Care Alliance
- Seattle Central Community College
- SPLASH
- Swedish Hospital & Medical Center
- University Presbyterian Church
- U.S. Fund for UNICEF
- VillageReach
- Washington MESA
- World Affairs Council of Seattle

== Data, computing and artificial intelligence ==
- Allen Institute for Artificial Intelligence (AI2)
- Northeastern University - Seattle Campus
- Pacific Northwest National Laboratory - Seattle Research Center
- University of Washington Computer Science & Engineering Department
