= KPRO =

KPRO may refer to:

- KPRO (FM), a radio station in Altus, Oklahoma, United States
- KPRO (Texas), a defunct radio station (1410 AM) in Marshall, Texas
- KPRO (California), a defunct radio station (1570 AM) in Riverside, California
- KFOO, a radio station (1440 AM) in Riverside, California, that used the KPRO call sign from 1941 to 1986
- Perry Municipal Airport (Iowa)

== See also ==
- Kaypro, an American computer manufacturer of the 1980s
- Boston keratoprosthesis, an artificial cornea
