= Eversight =

American not-for-profit organization

- Formation: 1947
- Type: Non-profit organization

Eversight is an American not-for-profit organization which operates a network of eye banks in the United States and South Korea. The company's mission is preservation and restoration of sight by facilitating corneal transplantation.

Eversight's operations include the recovery, evaluation, and distribution of donated eye tissue, which is used for corneal transplantation and scleral implantation, as well as research. The network is accredited by the Eye Bank Association of America (EBAA), and operates in compliance with EBAA Medical Standards and U.S. Food and Drug Administration (FDA) regulations.

== History ==
The network originated from two separate organizations: the Illinois Eye-Bank founded in 1947 in Chicago, and the Michigan Eye-Bank founded in Ann Arbor in 1957. The two groups merged in 1985 as Midwest Eye-Banks and Transplant Center. The name was shortened to Midwest Eye-Banks in 2004, and changed to Eversight in 2015.

Since the 1980s, Eversight has expanded to include other eye banks. The Upper Peninsula Lions Eye Bank in Marquette, Michigan, joined in 1989. BroMenn-Watson Gailey, founded in 1952 in Bloomington, Illinois, joined the network in 1996, and renamed to Illinois Eye-Bank, Watson Gailey in 2002. The Lions Eye Bank of New Jersey, founded in Newark in 1970, was acquired by Eversight in 2005. The Cleveland Eye Bank, serving northeastern Ohio since 1964, merged with Eversight in 2012. The Connecticut Eye Bank, established in 1961, became an affiliate in 2015. In the same year, Eversight established the first US-owned eye bank in South Korea.
