= Sri Lanka Eye Donation Society =

NGO involved in human tissue transplants

- Formation: 1961
- Founder: Deshabandu Dr. F. G. Hudson Silva
- Type: NGO
- Purpose: Donating human eyes and human tissues to patients in need
- Headquarters: Colombo, Sri Lanka
- Region served: Sri Lanka and around the world
- Medical Director: Dr. M. H. S. Cassim
- Website: http://www.eyedonation.lk/

Sri Lanka Eye Donation Society (Sinhala: ශ්‍රී ලංකා අක්ෂිදාන සංගමය, Tamil: இலங்கை அக்சிதான சங்கம்) is a non-governmental organization involved in donating human eyes and tissues for transplantation. It serves patients in need both in Sri Lanka and around the world. The society is a non-profit organization and provides the human eye corneas and tissues free of charge, except for a small fee on processing and delivery.

== History ==
Deshabandu Dr. Hudson Silva, the founder and inaugural president of the society, launched the first campaign to collect corneas in Sri Lanka in 1958 as a medical student. The first set of corneas he received in 1959 were stored in his home refrigerator at Ward Place in Colombo. Together with his wife, Padma Irangani Silva, he founded the Sri Lanka Eye Donation Society in 1961. In 1964 they sent their first overseas donation to Singapore; the corneas were packed in ice in a tea thermos and hand-carried during the flight.

Since then, conditions have improved and the organization has provided 60,000 corneas for corneal transplantation, for patients in 57 countries. More than 2,000,000 people have signed up to donate their eyes through the society after their death. The society receives about 3,000 corneas a year and more than 2,000 are shipped abroad due to a lack of requirements in Sri Lanka. The most prominent recipient country has been Pakistan (where the traditional Islamic law requires bodies to be buried whole and intact), with over 20,000 corneas. Egypt and Japan have received over 8,000 and 6,000 corneas, respectively. In Sri Lanka itself, citizens have first access to free corneas.

In 2003, the United Nations Association of Sri Lanka joined with the Sri Lanka Eye Donation Society to initiate the "Sight Project", with the aim of assisting patients in need of cornea transplants through United Nations Associations in their respective countries.

== Operation ==
The society has over 450 branches in Sri Lanka, with a manpower of over 15,000 trained volunteers who are ready to remove donor eyes on demand. Extraction is done within 4 hours of death, packed in ice and received at the laboratory within 4 hours. The extraction process has to be handled with care, to avoid damaging Corneal endothelium, a thin layer of cells on the inner surface of the cornea that pumps water away to keep it clear. Transplantation is carried out within 5 to 21 days from the removal of the body, depending on the type of preservation medium used. The donated corneas are tested for HIV, hepatitis, and sexually transmitted diseases before use.

Eye Bank & Tissue Bank

The Human Tissue Transplantation Act No. 48 of 1987 set out the legal framework for tissue procurement and transplantation in Sri Lanka. Since then, the Sri Lanka Eye Donation Society maintains the Sri Lanka International Eye Bank and Sri Lanka Model Human Tissue Bank, which is one of the largest in the world. The eye bank was established in late 1980s and the tissue bank in 1996. It is the first organization in the world that supplies or transplants corneas free of charge to the public.

== Cultural effects ==
Sri Lanka is among the largest cornea providers in the world. The cultural background of the country has helped the organization to thrive in eye donation. The Buddhist concept of Dāna or giving, has been the root cause of its success, in a country which approximately 70% of the population is Buddhist. Hindus and Christians have also donated eyes via the society. Many famous individuals, including the late Sri Lankan President J. R. Jayewardene, have donated their eyes upon death. Jayewardene's corneas were successfully grafted to two Japanese recipients.

== See also ==
- Corneal transplantation
- Eye bank
- Organ donation
