= Gerrit Melles =

Dutch ophthalmic surgeon

Gerrit R. J. Melles is a Dutch ophthalmic surgeon, known for developing various surgical techniques for lamellar keratoplasty - a partial corneal graft, as opposed to penetrating keratoplasty where the whole cornea is replaced - including the invention of Descemet's membrane endothelial keratoplasty in 2006.

Melles studied for his medical degree at the University of Leiden, subsequently undergoing his medical residency at the University of Nijmegen where he received his Ph.D. ("Keratotomy incision dimensions and wound healing") in 1995. He then worked at the Rotterdam Eye Hospital as a corneal fellow, before founding the Netherlands Institute for Innovative Ocular Surgery (NIIOS).

== Selected works ==
- Melles, G. R.; Eggink, F. A.; Lander, F.; Pels, E.; Rietveld, F. J.; Beekhuis, W. H.; Binder, P. S. (November 1998). "A surgical technique for posterior lamellar keratoplasty". Cornea. 17 (6): 618–626. PMID 9820943.
- Melles, Gerrit R. J.; Ong, T. San; Ververs, Bob; van der Wees, Jacqueline (September 2006). "Descemet membrane endothelial keratoplasty (DMEK)". Cornea. 25 (8): 987–990. PMID 17102683.

== Awards ==
- Helen Keller Prize for Vision Research (2017)
- Bressler Prize in Vision Science (2020)
- António Champalimaud Vision Award (2022)
