= Eye transplantation =

Transplantation of the globe of the human eye

- Specialty: Ophthalmology, neurosurgery
- Complications: Transplant rejection

Eye transplantation is the transplantation of the globe of the human eye from a donor to a recipient.

== Research directions ==
Research efforts in whole eye transplantation (WET) are focused on its application in living human recipients, still some obstacles need to be addressed. Apart from the surgical and neurological considerations, there are key ethical concerns such as patients' perceptions and desires for both nonvision-restoring WET and vision-restoring WET, risks and benefits compared to prosthetic alternatives, psychosocial considerations for potential recipients regarding personal identity related to the donor's eyes, public perceptions of whole-eye donation, implications for corneal transplantation eligibility of the donor's eyes, consent for whole-eye donation, and establishment of ethical mechanisms for allocation and distribution of WET. With limited studies available on this topic since the first vascularized composite allotransplantation (VCA) took place in 1998, the understanding of WET is informed by a few studies with limitations. For example, amphibian regeneration cannot directly apply to humans. Ocular transplants may offer a viable option for restoring form in patients undergoing facial transplantation with enucleated orbits.

== History ==
In 1885 the Revue générale d'ophtalmologie reported that the staphylomatous and buphthalmic eye of a 17-year-old girl had been replaced by the eye of a rabbit by a Dr. Chibret. The operation failed after 15 days due to a lack of effective immunosuppression.

In 1969, Conrad Moore of the Texas Medical Center claimed that he had carried out the transplantation of a whole eye, but he subsequently retracted his claim.

In November 2023, surgeons at NYU Langone Health announced the first successful eye transplantation, which was carried out as part of a partial face transplant in an operation that took 21 hours. The recipient, Aaron James, had lost the left side of his face with his eye, nose and mouth in a high-voltage power line accident. Reuters reported that the transplanted eye has "well-functioning blood vessels and a promising-looking retina". The eye is not using the optic nerve to communicate with the brain, and James has not regained sight through the eye. Adult stem cells have been harvested from his bone marrow and been injected into the optic nerve. The lead surgeon, Eduardo D. Rodriguez, said that "If some form of vision restoration occurred, it would be wonderful, but ... the goal was for us to perform the technical operation".

== See also ==
- Corneal transplantation
