= Keratoprosthesis =

Surgical procedure where a diseased cornea is replaced with an artificial one

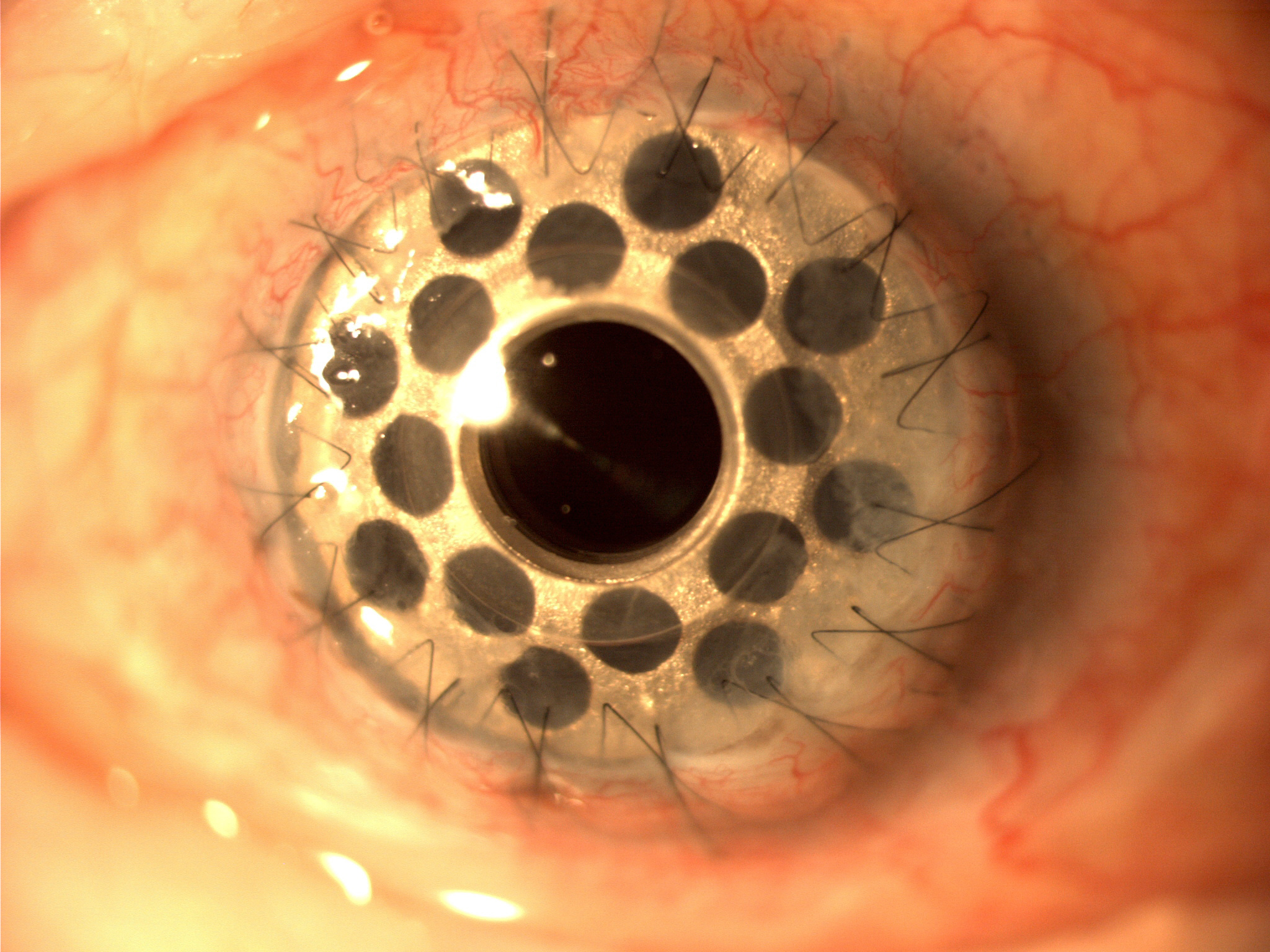
Boston Kpro type 1 titanium posterior plate

Keratoprosthesis is a surgical procedure where a diseased cornea is replaced with an artificial cornea. Traditionally, keratoprosthesis is recommended after a person has had a failure of one or more donor corneal transplants. More recently, a less invasive, non-penetrating artificial cornea has been developed which can be used in more routine cases of corneal blindness. While conventional cornea transplant uses donor tissue for transplant, an artificial cornea is used in the keratoprosthesis procedure. The surgery is performed to restore vision in patients with severely damaged cornea due to congenital birth defects, infections, injuries and burns.

Keratoprotheses are made of clear plastic with excellent tissue tolerance and optical properties. They vary in design, size and even the implantation techniques may differ across different treatment centers. The procedure is done by ophthalmologists, often on an outpatient basis.

The idea of artificial cornea was first proposed in 1789 by French ophthalmologist Guillaume Pellier de Quengsy.

== Types ==
Although many keratoprostheses have been developed, only four models are currently in commercial use: the Boston keratoprosthesis, osteo-odonto-keratoprosthesis (OOKP), AlphaCor and the KeraKlear artificial cornea.

== Indications ==
Indications for penetrating keratoprotheses include the following:

- Treatment of patients whose vision is less than 20/200 in the affected eye.
- Patients with failed corneal transplant using donor cornea and have little or no vision left.
- Patients with non-autoimmune diseases, congenital birth defects and other ocular problems.
- Patients who do not have access to corneal transplant tissue

Indications for non-penetrating keratoprostheses include the following:

- Keratoconus
- Corneal Dystrophies
- Corneal scars not related to active inflammation in the eye
- Corneal edema
- Limbal stem cell deficiency (e.g. Aniridia)
- Failed corneal transplants with a non-inflammatory original diagnosis (e.g. keratoconus)

== Pre-operative examination ==
In most cases, the patient meets the ophthalmologist for eye examination and other tests weeks or months preceding surgery. During the meeting, the ophthalmologist will examine the eye and diagnose its condition. The doctor will also record the history of the patient's health and other previous eye treatments, if any. The doctor will discuss the risks and benefits of the surgery. If the patient elects for the surgery, the doctor will have the patient sign an informed consent form. The doctor may also perform physical and lab examinations, such as an X-ray, an EKG, a slit lamp test, an ultrasound B-scan, or an A-scan.

The surgery date and time is also set, and the patient will also be told where the surgery will take place. The patient can also make any other queries regarding the procedure.

== Patient selection ==
- Vision should not be better than 20/200.
- Blink and tear mechanisms should be reasonably intact.
- Retina should be in place and there should not be extreme optic nerve cupping.
- Consider shunt if patient has advanced stage of glaucoma.

== Procedure ==
On the day of the procedure, the patient will arrive to the hospital or laser center where the surgery is to be performed. After a brief physical examination, the patient will be taken to the operating room. General anesthesia or local anesthesia is given before the surgery begins.

An eyelid speculum is used to keep the eye open throughout the surgery. Some lubrication may be used to prevent the eye from drying. Depending on the type of keratoprosthesis used, the surgery may involve a full thickness replacement of the cornea or the placement of an intralamellar implant. For the Alphacor a manual incision is used to create a corneal pocket and a punch is used to create an opening through the posterior cornea into the anterior chamber. The Alphacor is then inserted into the corneal pocket to allow for bio-integration after several months, a second procedure is used to remove part of the anterior cornea to allow light to reach the retina. In the case of the KeraKlear, the intralamellar pocket is created with a femtosecond laser or a corneal pocket making microkeratome. The posterior cornea is left intact.

Typically, there is a follow-up session few days after surgery, when patients' complaints are addressed and modifications are made, if needed.

Since keratoprosthesis surgeries are evolving, constant attempts are being made to improve the outcome of the surgery. Also, the material and design used in the artificial cornea may vary and as a result of this, there can be minor variations in surgical procedure as well.

The surgery is done on an outpatient basis with the patient returning home the same day.

== Risks ==
Though the rate of success with keratoprosthesis is high, in rare cases, certain serious complications could occur.

- Glaucoma and extrusion of the implant are serious complications that could occur.
- Sudden vitritis can cause a drastic reduction in vision. However, it is possible to treat this condition through antibiotics or by a minor laser surgery.
- Inflammation of the eye tissue could occur. This condition is also treatable.

Usage of keratoprosthesis is typically considered when multiple donor corneal transplants have failed for a patient. A Cochrane Review found no controlled trials comparing the effectiveness of artificial corneas with donor corneas for repeat corneas transplantations.

== Prognosis ==
The primary purpose of keratoprosthesis is to improve vision in patients with complex ocular diseases who are at high risk for donor graft failure. After an impressive success record with keratoprosthesis in adults, the procedure is used to treat young patients with severe ocular deformities.

== Economics ==
Keratoprosthesis is continuously evolving with newer generation materials that seek to improve treatment outcomes. However, the cost of surgery is on the expensive side and can typically run up to $35,000 in the US. In order to obtain surgical treatment at a lower cost, many patients choose to get the treatment done from popular medical tourism destinations like India and Singapore where the cost of treatment may be as little as one fourth the cost as in the US or the UK.
