= Corneal dystrophy-perceptive deafness syndrome =

- Other names: Congenital corneal dystrophy, progressive sensorineural deafness, Harboyan syndrome, CDPD (abbr.), Corneal dystrophy and sensorineural deafness.
- This disorder is inherited in an autosomal recessive manner most of the time.
- Specialty: Medical genetics
- Causes: Genetic mutation
- Prevention: none
- Prognosis: medium
- Frequency: rare, about 24 cases have been described in medical literature
- Deaths: -

Corneal dystrophy-perceptive deafness syndrome, also known as Harboyan syndrome, is a rare genetic disorder characterized by congenital hereditary corneal dystrophy that occurs alongside progressive hearing loss of post-lingual onset.

== Signs and symptoms ==
Below is a list of the symptoms people with this condition exhibit:

- Corneal dystrophy
- Clouding of the cornea
- Nystagmus
- Blurry vision
- Generalized vision impairment
- Progressive post-lingual hearing loss

The latter usually appears between the ages of 20 and 30 years old.

=== Complications ===
The hearing loss and visual impairment associated with this condition can cause difficulties with living.

== Genetics ==
This condition is caused by mutations in the SLC4A11 gene which are inherited in an autosomal recessive manner (most of the time). Desir et al. (2007) identified mutations in this gene in 6 families, of which 3 were consanguineous and 3 were not, they found homozygosity for the mutation in the consanguineous families and compound heterozygosity in the non-consanguineous families.

== Diagnosis ==
A diagnosis can be made by general symptom examination and with both ophthalmologic and audiometric studies.

== Treatment ==
Although this condition has no cure, it can be treated.

=== Hearing loss ===
- Hearing aids
- Cochlear implant

=== Corneal dystrophy ===
- Contact lenses
- Corneal transplant

== Prevalence ==
According to OrphaNet, only 24 cases from 11 families across the world have been described in medical literature, these families' origins were very diverse, including Indigenous South American, Sephardic Jewish, Brazilian (of Portuguese descent), Dutch, Romani, Moroccan, and Dominican.

== See also ==
- Corneal dystrophy
- Sensorineural hearing loss
