= SightLife =

Eye bank

- Founded: 1969
- Type: Nonprofit organization
- Headquarters: Seattle, Washington, U.S.
- Services: Corneal transplantation, eye banking, ocular research, and education
- Website: sightlife.org
- Formerly called: Northwest Lions Eye Bank

SightLife is an eye bank, a non-profit organization that obtains, medically evaluates and distributes corneas donated by individuals for use in corneal transplantation, research, and education. Since 2009 it has been the leading eye bank in the United States. SightLife provides volunteer services in India, Paraguay and Nepal. In August 2022, SightLife was acquired by Lions Eye Institute. The combined company will be the largest eye bank, tissue recovery and ocular research center in the world with nearly 300 employees.

== Description ==
SightLife provides tools, training, and resources to eye banks to help them develop the capacity to serve the needs of the corneal blind. It was founded in 1969 in Seattle as the Northwest Lions Eye Bank. By 2009, SightLife had become the leading U.S. eye bank, and it began its planned international expansion.

SightLife maintains relationships with donor families and recipients. They provide resources to educate and help them through the process of donation or transplantation. They also allow donor families and recipients to tell their stories. On average, about 65 percent of families consent to donation after receiving information and counseling about eye donation. In 2018, SightLife acquired Karma Inlay, a corneal inlay technology, from AcuFocus for an undisclosed amount.

== Accreditation ==
- Accredited by the Eye Bank Association of America.
- Registered with the Food & Drug Administration.

== Recognition ==
- Best Nonprofits to Work For, Nonprofit Times, 2013, 2012, 2011, 2010
- Non-Profit of the Year, South Lake Union Chamber of Commerce, 2012
- 100 Best Companies to Work For, Seattle Business Magazine, 2012, 2008, 2007
- Leaders in Health Care: Outstanding Global Health Organization, Seattle Business Magazine, February 2011 — Runner-Up
- Donor Designation Medal of Honor, Donate Life America, 2010
- Washington's Best Workplaces, Puget Sound Business Journal, 2010, 2007
- Cornea Collaborative 2007-2009, Eye Bank Association of America, First Place: Conversion Rate, Second Place: Death to Release
- Distinguished Service Award, Lions Multiple District 19 B, 2007-2008
- Evergreen Award, Washington State Nonprofit Conference, April 1, 2004
- Export Achievement Certificate, United States Department of Commerce, November 20, 2003
