= Eye bank =

Organization that recovers donated eyes

Eye banks recover, prepare and deliver donated eyes for cornea transplants and research. The first successful cornea transplant was performed in 1905 and the first eye bank was founded in 1944. Currently, in the United States, eye banks provide tissue for over 80,000 cornea transplants each year to treat conditions such as keratoconus and corneal scarring. In some cases, the white of the eye (sclera) is used to surgically repair recipient eyes. Unlike other organs and tissues, corneas are in adequate supply for transplants in the United States, and excess tissue is exported internationally, where there are shortages in many countries, due to greater demand and a less-developed eye banking infrastructure.

== History ==
In 1905, when Eduard Konrad Zirm, MD, performed the first successful full thickness corneal transplant, a long line of corneal transplantation, research and techniques began. During its existence, Zirm's eye bank, located in a rural area of Austria, treated over 47,000 patients.

Ramón Castroviejo, a Spanish ophthalmologist, was an influential figure in both European and American developments in corneal transplantation, particularly from the 1920s through the 1940s. During his research fellowship at the Mayo Clinic, he developed a double-bladed knife for square grafts and conducted research that culminated in the development of new keratoplasty techniques.

The 1940s not only brought improvements to corneal transplantation, but also an incentive to mainstream those procedures into eye banking. R. Townley Paton, a renowned American ophthalmologist had become affiliated with Manhattan Eye, Ear & Throat Hospital, where he began performing corneal transplants with privately acquired tissue. After performing many corneal transplants, Paton came to the conclusion that a formal system of eye collection needed to be developed – thus, the eye bank was born. In 1944, Paton established the world's first eye bank, the Eye-Bank for Sight Restoration, in New York.

The establishment of the world's first eye bank was only the beginning of the great steps taken to improve corneal transplantation and to increase eye banking's influence in the transplantation community. In 1955, 27 ophthalmologists (representing 12 eye banks), met with four major medical groups under the auspices of the American Academy of Ophthalmology and Otolaryngology (AAO&O). During that meeting, a Committee on Eye-Banks was formed and Paton was named chairman.

Between 1956 and 1960, the Committee met numerous times, discussing various challenges shared by eye-banks, such as methods for increasing eye donations, the need for central clearing houses and the urgent need for uniform legislation in the eye-bank field. In October 1961, the Committee of Eye-Banks formed the Association during an organizational meeting in Chicago and named it the Eye Bank Association of America (EBAA).

== Recovery of eye tissue ==
"Recovery" refers to the retrieval of organs or tissues from a deceased organ donor. Recovery is currently the preferred term; although "harvesting" and "procurement" have been used in the past, they are considered inappropriate, harsh, and potentially inaccurate.

When an organ/tissue donor dies, consent for donation is obtained either from a donor registry or from the donor's next of kin. A recovery technician is then dispatched to the hospital, funeral home, or medical examiner's office to recover the donor's eyes. The recovery occurs within hours of the death of the donor. The entire eye, called the globe, may be surgically removed (enucleated), or only the cornea may be excised in-situ and placed in storage media. There is a wide variety of storage media used in eye banking. Commercial preparations as well as organ culture medium can preserve corneas. The eye tissue is then transported to the eye bank for examination and preparation.

== Laboratory processing ==
A sample of the donor's blood is also collected to test for infectious diseases such as HIV, hepatitis B, hepatitis C, human cytomegalovirus, syphilis, and sometimes others. The blood type is also tested, although corneas do not receive any blood supply and type matching is not necessary for transplantation.

If the entire eye is enucleated during the original recovery, then the cornea and part of the sclera are removed and placed in a container with preservation medium, and the sclera is cleaned and then preserved in alcohol. The corneas are visually examined and evaluated underneath a slit-lamp, and the number of endothelial cells is counted underneath a specular microscope.

== Regulations ==
The Eye Bank Association of America (EBAA) was established in 1961, and its members include eye banks that operate not only in the United States, but also in Canada, Europe, the Middle East, and Asia. The EBAA has established comprehensive medical standards for eye banks, and the standardized the training and certification of eye bank technicians. These interventions are considered major contributions to the current safety of eye transplantation. The EBAA is the national accrediting agency for eye banks. Accreditation requires site visits at least once every three years by the EBAA to evaluate adherence to established standards and quality control. The U.S. Food and Drug Administration (FDA) licenses eye banks, and conducts their own inspections, typically on a two-to-three year cycle.

To avoid violating the Health Insurance Portability and Accountability Act, eye banks must, through their legal anatomical authorizations, obtain consent for Eye Bank Association of America representatives to gain access to donor information for accreditation reviews.

== See also ==
- Sri Lanka Eye Donation Society
- Illinois Eye Bank
- SightLife
