= Boston keratoprosthesis =

Prosthetic cornea

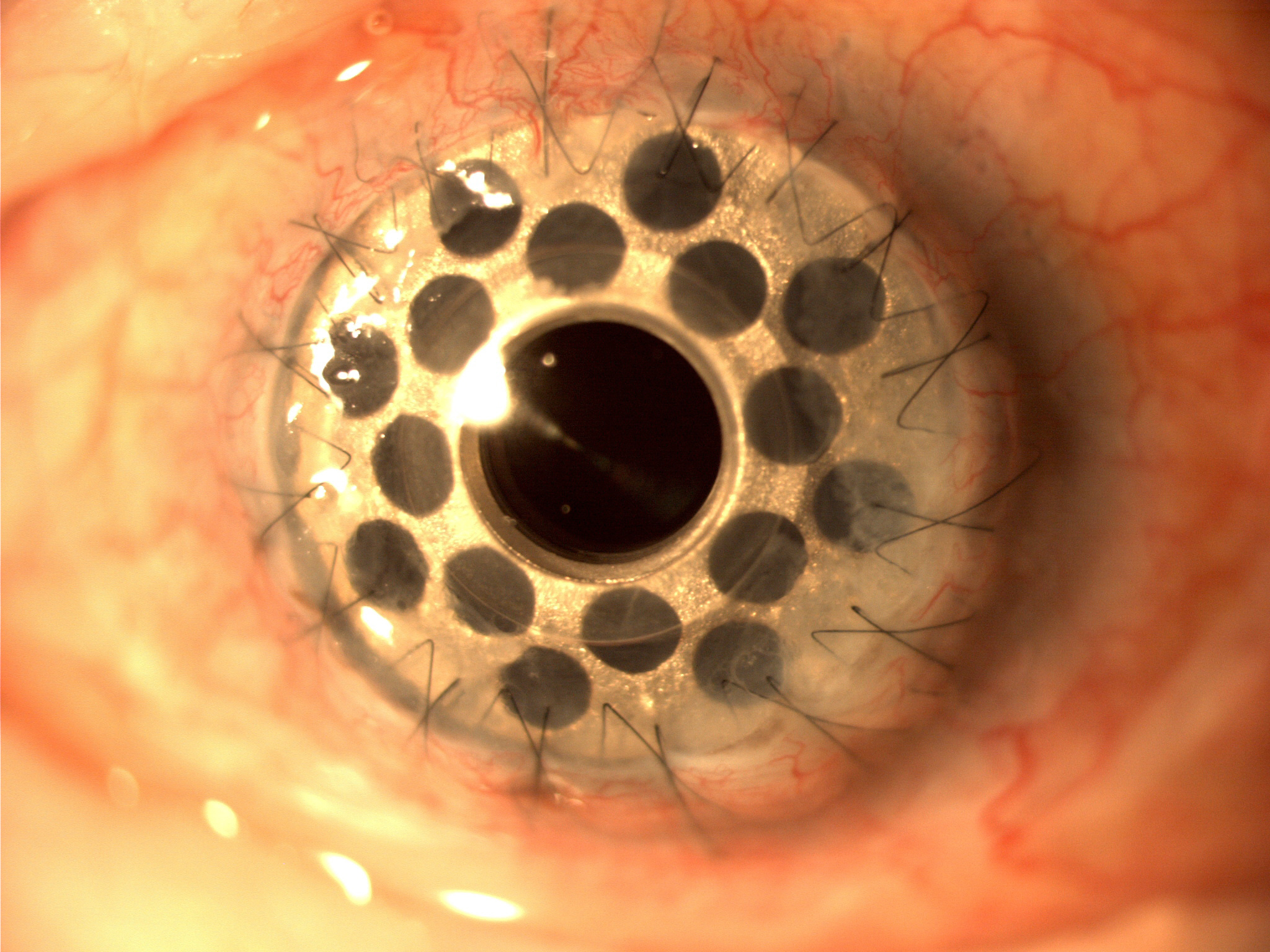
- Boston Kpro type 1 titanium posterior plate
- Specialty: Ophthalmology

Boston keratoprosthesis (Boston KPro) is a collar button design keratoprosthesis or artificial cornea. It is composed of a front plate with a stem, which houses the optical portion of the device, a back plate and a titanium locking c-ring. It is available in type I and type II formats. The type I design is used much more frequently than the type II which is reserved for severe end stage dry eye conditions and is similar to the type I except it has a 2 mm anterior nub designed to penetrate through a tarsorrhaphy. The type I format will be discussed here as it is more commonly used.

The type I Kpro is available in single standard pseudophakic power or customized aphakic optic with an 8.5 mm diameter adult size or 7.0 mm diameter pediatric size back plate. The device is currently machined from medical grade polymethylmethacrylate (PMMA) in Wilmington, Massachusetts in the United States. During implantation of the device, the device is assembled with a donor corneal graft positioned between the front and back plate which is then sutured into place in a similar fashion to penetrating keratoplasty (corneal transplantation).

== Indications ==
The Boston KPro is a treatment option for corneal disorders not amenable to standard penetrating keratoplasty (corneal transplantation) or corneal transplant. The Boston KPro is a proven primary treatment option for repeat graft failure, herpetic keratitis, aniridia and many pediatric congenital corneal opacities including Peter's anomaly. The device is also used to treat cicatrizing conditions including Stevens–Johnson syndrome and ocular cicatricial pemphigoid, and also ocular burns.

== Complications ==
Most common postoperative complications in order of decreasing prevalence include retroprosthetic membrane (RPM), elevated intraocular pressure/glaucoma, infectious endophthalmitis, sterile vitritis, retina detachment (rare) and vitreous hemorrhage (rare).

== Postoperative management ==
1. Indefinite placement of a bandage contact lens is needed to maintain adequate ocular surface hydration and prevent stromal melt, dellen formation, tissue melt and necrosis.
2. Indefinite daily topical antibiotic prophylaxis.
3. Lifelong topical steroids.
4. Close follow-up with an ophthalmologist to monitor for complications associated with the device. Although the surgical procedure is relatively straightforward for surgeons trained to perform corneal transplants, the follow-up required after KPro placement is lifelong.

== Outcomes ==
Four major studies have been completed to date showing outcomes with the type I Boston KPro:

1. Multicenter Boston KPro Study is the largest published to date with 141 Boston type I keratoprosthesis procedures from 17 surgical sites by 39 different surgeons. At an average follow-up of 8.5 months, retention rate of the device was 95%, 57% had BCVA ≥ 20/200. Postoperative complications included RPM in 25%, high IOP in 15%, sterile vitritis complicated the postoperative course of 5% of eyes. Importantly, no cases of infectious endophthalmitis were reported in this large series.
2. A large single surgeon series with 57 modern type I Boston KPro procedures from UCLA medical center. At an average follow-up of 17 months, retention rate of the device was 84%, 75% had BCVA ≥ 20/200. Postoperative complications included RPM in 25%, high IOP in 15%, sterile vitritis complicated the postoperative course of 5% of eyes. Postoperative complications included RPM in 44%, high IOP in 18%, sterile vitritis complicated the postoperative course of 10% of eyes. No cases of infectious enophthalmitis were reported in this series.
3. A single center study from UC Davis of 30 Boston type I KPro procedures. At an average follow-up of 19 months, retention rate of the device was 83%, 77% had BCVA ≥ 20/200. Postoperative complications included RPM in 43%, high IOP in 27%, sterile vitritis complicated the postoperative course of 3% of eyes. The rate of infectious endophthalmitis in this study was 10%.
4. A retrospective study of 36 Boston Type I KPro procedures from a single institution. At an average follow-up of 16 months, retention rate of the device was 100%, 83% had BCVA ≥ 20/200. Postoperative complications included RPM in 65% and high IOP in 38%. Infectious endophthalmitis complicated 11% of eyes during the postoperative period.

== History ==
Boston ophthalmologist Swedish origins Claes Henrik Dohlman began developing the Boston keratoprosthesis in 1965, and refined it over the next decades. It was approved by the U.S. Food and Drug Administration in 1992. Fewer than 50 of the devices had been implanted before 2002, when popularity began increasing. 1,161 had been placed by 2009, 8,000 by 2012, 9,000 by 2014. and 16,000 by 2020.

The design of the device has evolved over its history. In 1996, eight holes were added in the back plate. The holes allow the aqueous humour fluids of the eye to provide nutrients to the donor graft stroma and keratocytes. The device is now available with either eight or 16 holes. In 2004, a titanium locking c-ring was added to prevent intraocular unscrewing of the device. In 2007, a threadless design replaced the previous screw-type one, simplifying assembly and reducing damage to the donor graft when the device is assembled during the surgical procedure. The back plate was changed to titanium in 2012, due to titanium's biocompatibility.
