= Corneal transplantation =

Surgical procedure of repairing corneal tissue to treat corneal blindness

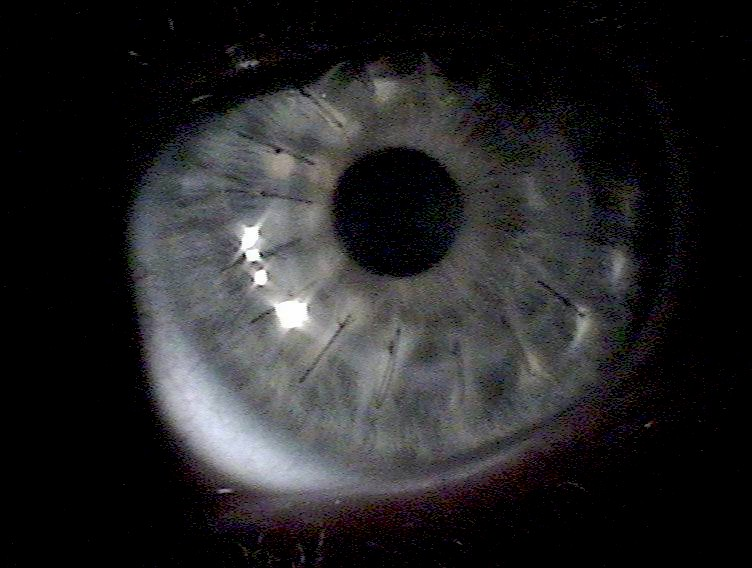
- Cornea transplant approximately one week after surgery. Multiple light reflections indicate folds in the cornea, which were later resolved.
- Other names: Corneal grafting
- ICD-9-CM: 11.6
- MeSH: D016039
- MedlinePlus: 003008

Corneal transplantation, also known as corneal grafting, is a surgical procedure where a damaged or diseased cornea is replaced by donated corneal tissue (the graft). When the entire cornea is replaced it is known as penetrating keratoplasty and when only part of the cornea is replaced it is known as lamellar keratoplasty. Keratoplasty simply means surgery to the cornea. The graft is taken from a recently deceased individual with no known diseases or other factors that may affect the chance of survival of the donated tissue or the health of the recipient.

The cornea is the transparent front part of the eye that covers the iris, pupil and anterior chamber. The surgical procedure is performed by ophthalmologists, physicians who specialize in eyes, and is often done on an outpatient basis. Donors can be of any age, as is shown in the case of Janis Babson, who donated her eyes after dying at the age of 10. Corneal transplantation is performed when medicines, keratoconus conservative surgery and cross-linking can no longer heal the cornea.

This surgical procedure usually treats corneal blindness, with success rates of at least 41% as of 2021.

== Medical uses ==
Indications include the following:

- Optical: To improve visual acuity by replacing the opaque or distorted host tissue by clear healthy donor tissue. The most common indication in this category is pseudophakic bullous keratopathy, followed by keratoconus, corneal degeneration, keratoglobus and dystrophy, as well as scarring due to keratitis and trauma.
- Tectonic/reconstructive: To preserve corneal anatomy and integrity in patients with stromal thinning and descemetoceles, or to reconstruct the anatomy of the eye, e.g. after corneal perforation.
- Therapeutic: To remove inflamed corneal tissue unresponsive to treatment by antibiotics or anti-virals.
- Cosmetic: To improve the appearance of patients with corneal scars that have given a whitish or opaque hue to the cornea.

== Risks ==
The risks are similar to other intraocular procedures, but additionally include graft rejection (lifelong), detachment or displacement of lamellar transplants and primary graft failure. Use of immunosuppressants including cyclosporine A, tacrolimus, mycophenolate mofetil, sirolimus, and leflunomide to prevent graft rejection is increasing but there is insufficient evidence to ascertain which immunosuppressant is better. In a Cochrane review which included low to moderate quality evidence, adverse effects were found to be common with systemic mycophenolate mofetil, but less common with topical cyclosporine A or tacrolimus.

There is also a risk of infection. Since the cornea has no blood vessels (it takes its nutrients from the aqueous humor) it heals much more slowly than a cut on the skin. While the wound is healing, it is possible that it might become infected by various microorganisms. This risk is minimized by antibiotic prophylaxis (using antibiotic eyedrops, even when no infection exists).

There is a risk of cornea rejection, which occurs in about 10% of cases. Graft failure can occur at any time after the cornea has been transplanted, even years or decades later. The causes can vary, though it is usually due to new injury or illness. Treatment can be either medical or surgical, depending on the individual case. An early, technical cause of failure may be an excessively tight stitch cheesewiring through the sclera.

Infectious disease transmission through corneal transplantation is exceedingly rare. All corneal grafts are screened for the presence of viruses such as HIV or hepatitis through antibody or nucleic acid testing, and there has never been a reported case of HIV transmission through corneal transplant surgery. Prior to the development of reliable HIV testing, many countries instituted bans on corneal donation by gay men. For example, on 20 May 1994, the United States banned corneal donation by any man who has had sex with another man in the preceding 5 years, even if all HIV testing is negative (a policy which continues to be enforced today).

== Procedure ==
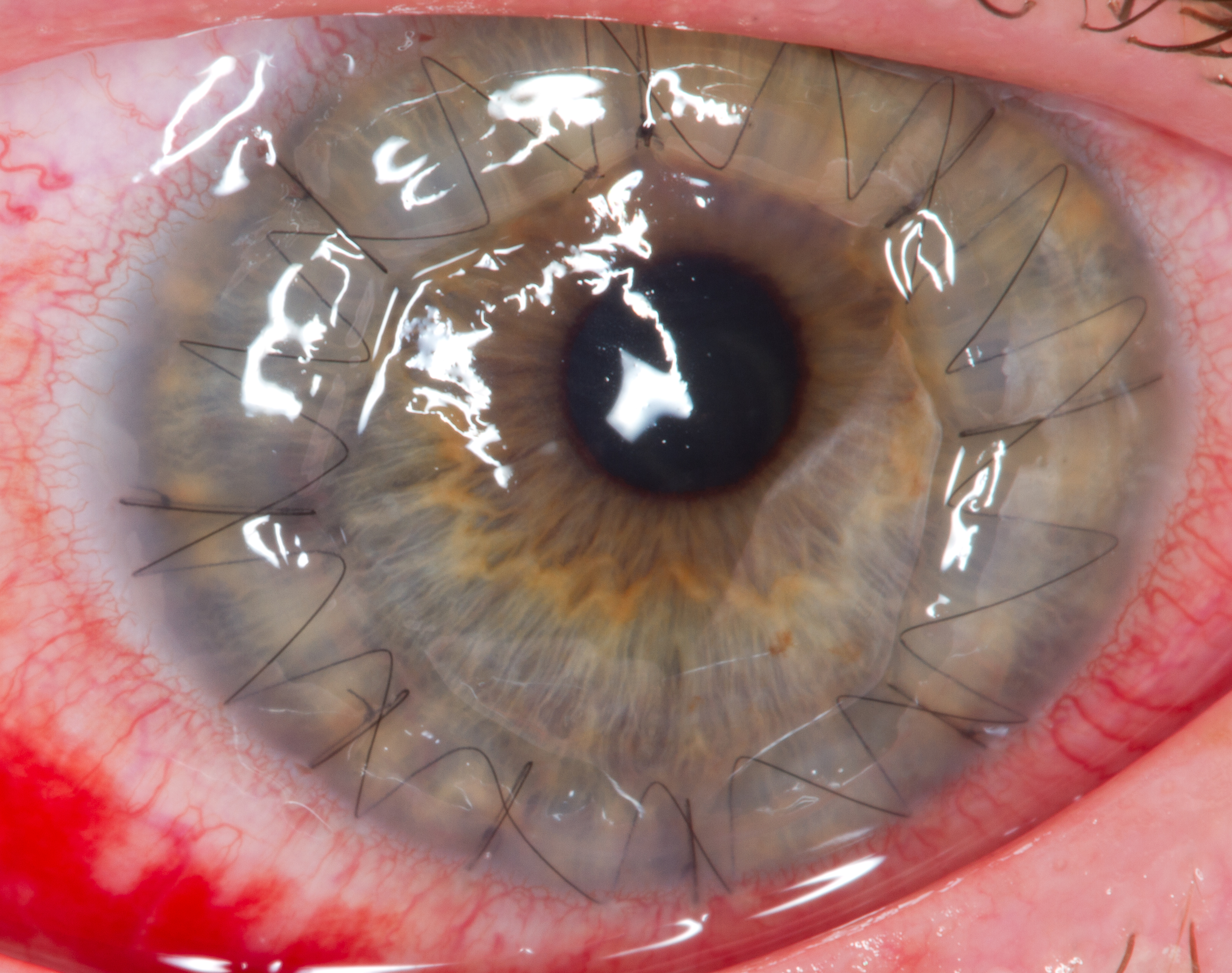
Cornea transplant one day after surgery.

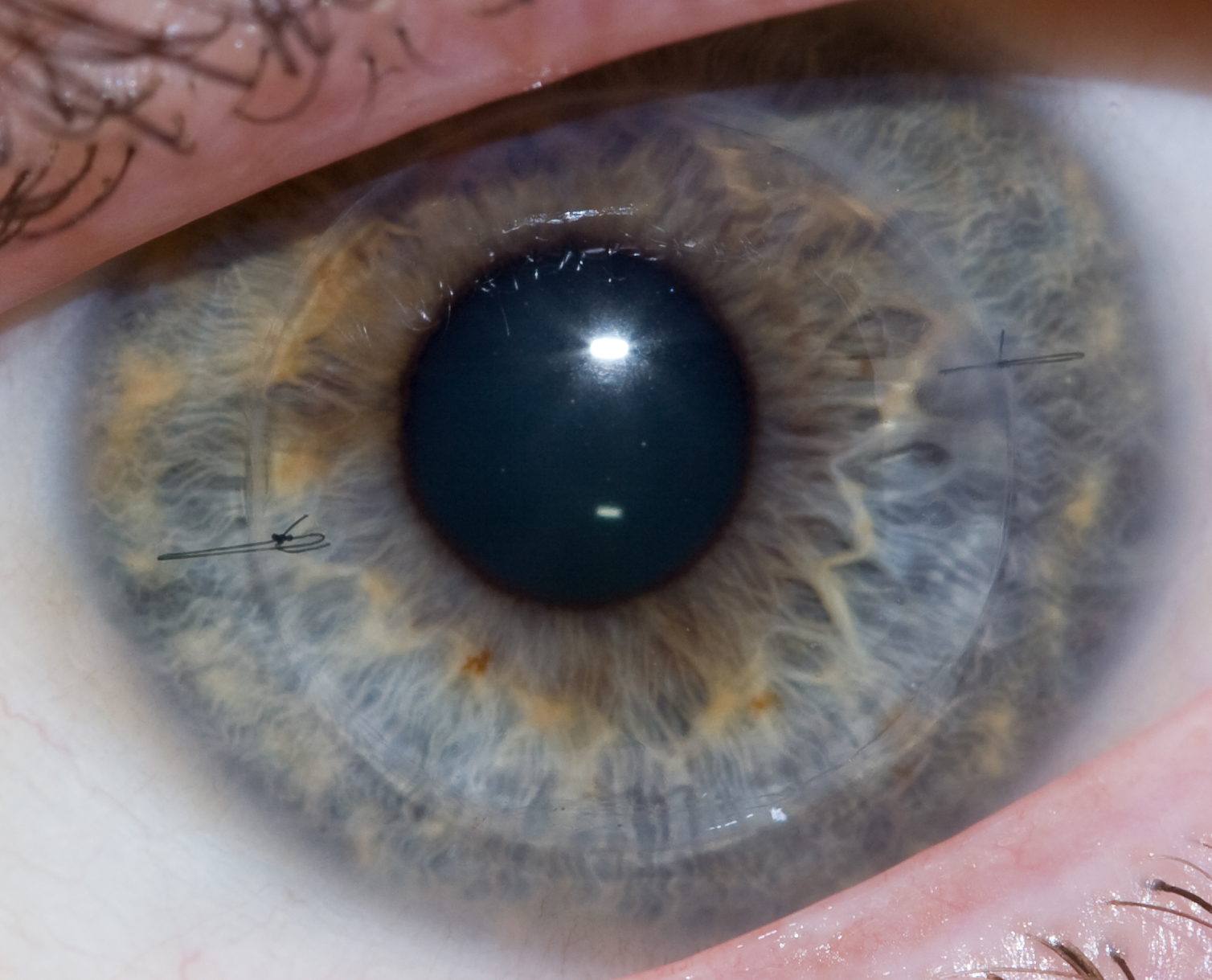
Cornea transplant after one year of healing, two stitches are visible

On the day of the surgery, the patient arrives to either a hospital or an outpatient surgery center, where the procedure will be performed. The patient is given a brief physical examination by the surgical team and is taken to the operating room. In the operating room, the patient lies down on an operating table and is either given general anesthesia, or local anesthesia and a sedative.

With anesthesia induced, the surgical team prepares the eye to be operated on and drapes the face around the eye. An eyelid speculum is placed to keep the lids open, and some lubrication is placed on the eye to prevent drying. In children, a metal ring is stitched to the sclera which will provide support of the sclera during the procedure.

=== Pre-operative examination ===
In most instances, the person will meet with their ophthalmologist for an examination in the weeks or months preceding the surgery. During the exam, the ophthalmologist will examine the eye and diagnose the condition. The doctor will then discuss the condition with the patient, including the different treatment options available. The doctor will also discuss the risks and benefits of the various options. If the patient elects to proceed with the surgery, the doctor will have the patient sign an informed consent form. The doctor might also perform a physical examination and order lab tests, such as blood work, X-rays, or an EKG.

The surgery date and time will also be set, and the patient will be told where the surgery will take place. Within the United States, the supply of corneas is sufficient to meet the demand for surgery and research purposes. Therefore, unlike other tissues for transplantation, delays and shortages are not usually an issue.

=== Penetrating keratoplasty ===
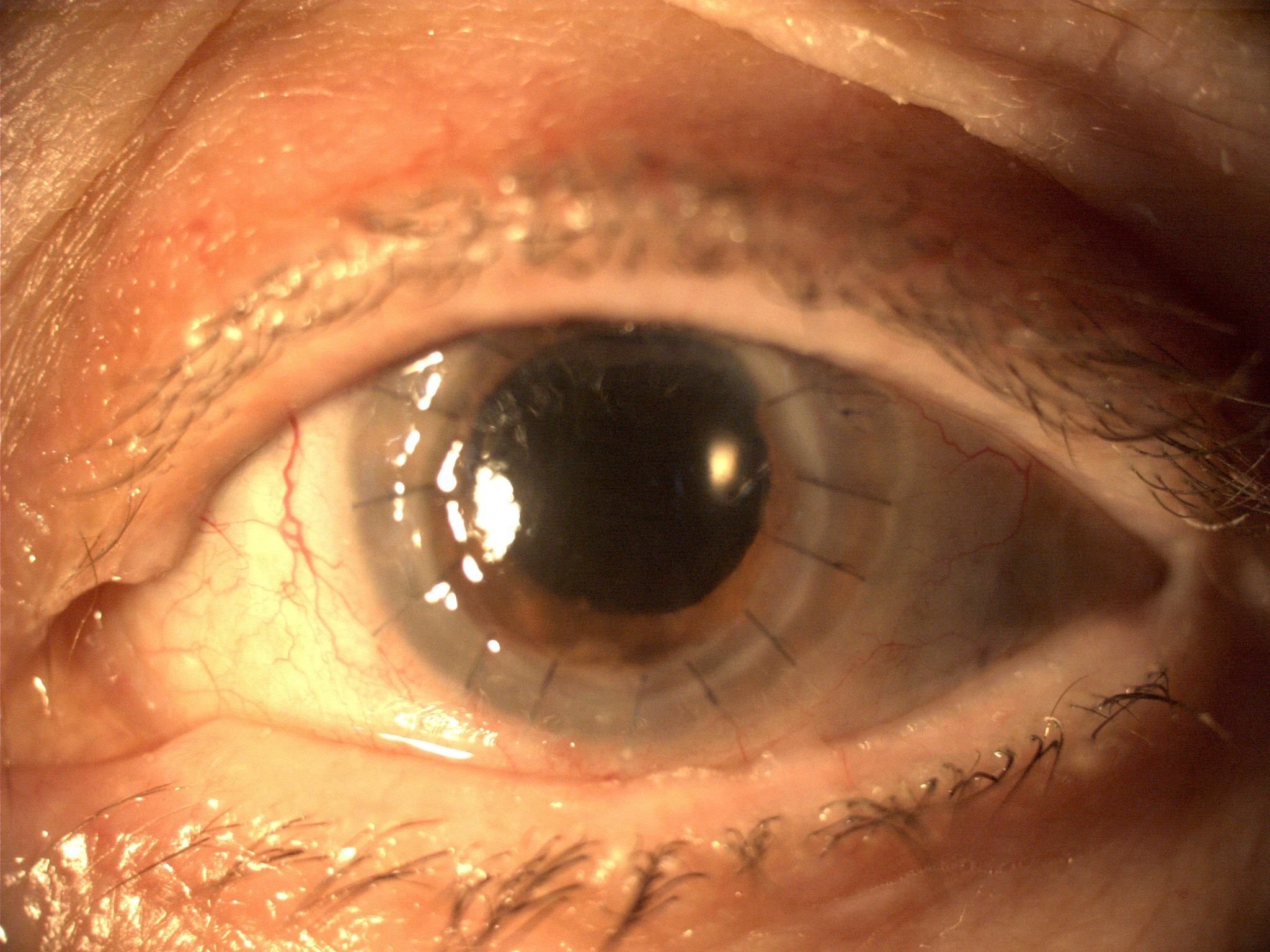
Replacement of the entire cornea

A trephine (a circular cutting device), which removes a circular disc of cornea, is used by the surgeon to cut the donor cornea. A second trephine is then used to remove a similar-sized portion of the patient's cornea. The donor tissue is then sewn in place with sutures.

Antibiotic eyedrops are placed, the eye is patched, and the patient is taken to a recovery area while the effects of the anesthesia wear off. The patient typically goes home following this and sees the doctor the following day for the first postoperative appointment.

=== Lamellar keratoplasty ===
Lamellar keratoplasty encompasses several techniques which selectively replace diseased layers of the cornea while leaving healthy layers in place. The chief advantage is improved tectonic integrity of the eye. Disadvantages include the technically challenging nature of these procedures, which replace portions of a structure only 500 μm thick, and reduced optical performance of the donor/recipient interface compared to full-thickness keratoplasty.

==== Deep anterior lamellar keratoplasty ====
In this procedure, the anterior layers of the central cornea are removed and replaced with donor tissue. Endothelial cells and the Descemets membrane are left in place. This technique is used in cases of anterior corneal opacifications, scars, and ectatic diseases such as keratoconus.

==== Corneal Allogenic Intrastromal Ring Segments (CAIRS) ====
Corneal Allogenic Intrastromal Ring Segment Keratoplasty (CAIRS Keratoplasty) is a modern surgical technique used in the treatment of keratoconus. It involves implanting finely shaped pieces of donor corneal tissue into the corneal stroma to reinforce and reshape the weakened, ectatic cornea, thereby improving both corneal structure and visual clarity. Because CAIRS uses biological graft material and has demonstrated strong outcomes with a favourable safety profile, it is formally recognised as a corneal transplantation procedure by health funding authorities in Australia, the United Kingdom, Japan, Germany, Brazil, the Netherlands, and a number of other countries.

In contrast to traditional synthetic intrastromal corneal ring segments (ICRS) made from materials such as PMMA, CAIRS keratoplasty uses preserved allogeneic corneal tissue. This biological compatibility reduces the likelihood of complications sometimes seen with non-organic implants, including extrusion, infection, or chronic foreign body reaction.

The CAIRS technique was pioneered by Dr Soosan Jacob, who first introduced it in 2018 through a large case series published in the Journal of Refractive Surgery. One of its key strengths is its suitability for corneas with irregular or decentered cones. The donor segments can be individually designed to achieve targeted corneal flattening and astigmatism improvement. Subsequent clinical studies have supported the effectiveness and stability of CAIRS across various forms of corneal ectasia, with promising results maintained for up to five years. Dr Jacob also holds patents for specialised trephination and implantation instruments, further standardising and refining the procedure.

The high degree of customisation available with CAIRS keratoplasty is one of its greatest clinical advantages, enabling surgeons to tailor treatment to the patient's specific topography and visual needs. Some commercial providers have introduced branded versions of pre-prepared donor segments, such as "CTAK". While the branding differs, these procedures are still CAIRS keratoplasty; the trademarked names apply only to the tissue supply or preparation system rather than the surgical concept itself.

To support surgeons in planning CAIRS procedures, Dr Brendan Cronin and Dr David Gunn, keratoconus specialists based in Brisbane, Australia, have developed a free web-based planning resource: www.cairsplan.com. This platform provides guidance and planning tools to help optimize surgical outcomes and expand access to this innovative approach.

==== Endothelial keratoplasty ====
Endothelial keratoplasty replaces the patient's endothelium with a transplanted disc of posterior stroma/Descemets/endothelium (DSEK) or Descemets/endothelium (DMEK).

This relatively new procedure has revolutionized treatment of disorders of the innermost layer of the cornea (endothelium). Unlike a full-thickness corneal transplant, the surgery can be performed with one or no sutures. Patients may recover functional vision in days to weeks, as opposed to up to a year with full thickness transplants. However, an Australian study has shown that despite its benefits, the loss of endothelial cells that maintain transparency is much higher in DSEK compared to a full-thickness corneal transplant. The reason may be greater tissue manipulation during surgery, the study concluded.

During surgery the patient's corneal endothelium is removed and replaced with donor tissue. With DSEK, the donor includes a thin layer of stroma, as well as endothelium, and is commonly 100–150 μm thick. With DMEK, only the endothelium is transplanted. In the immediate postoperative period the donor tissue is held in position with an air bubble placed inside the eye (the anterior chamber). The tissue self-adheres in a short period and the air is adsorbed into the surrounding tissues.

Complications include displacement of the donor tissue requiring repositioning ("refloating"). This is more common with DMEK than DSEK. Folds in the donor tissue may reduce the quality of vision, requiring repair. Rejection of the donor tissue may require repeating the procedure. Gradual reduction in endothelial cell density over time can lead to loss of clarity and require repeating the procedure.

Patients with endothelial transplants frequently achieve best corrected vision in the 20/30 to 20/40 range, although some reach 20/20. Optical irregularity at the graft/host interface may limit vision below 20/20.

== Synthetic corneas ==
=== Boston keratoprosthesis ===
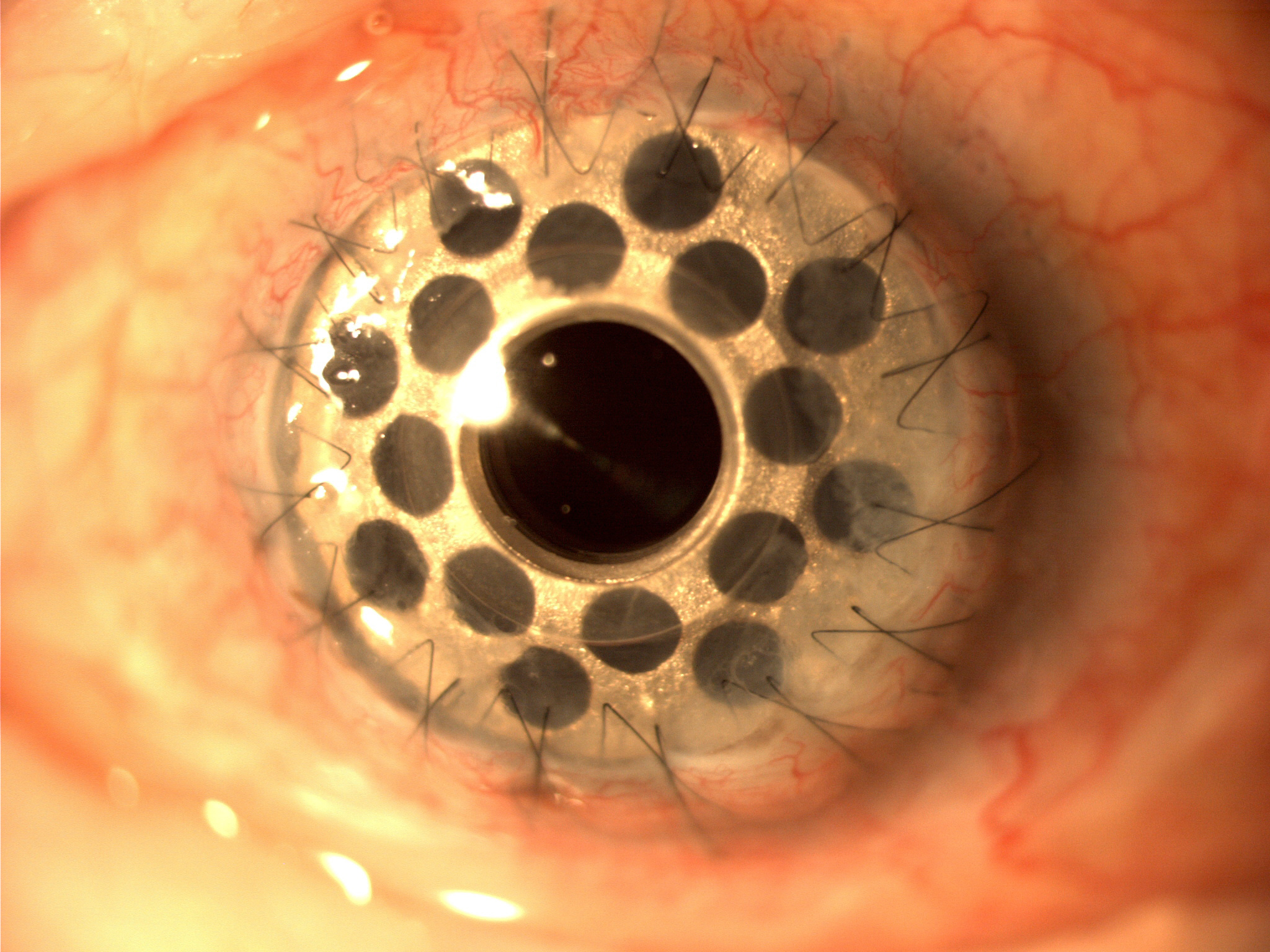
Boston Kpro type 1 titanium posterior plate

The Boston keratoprosthesis is the most widely used synthetic cornea to date with over 900 procedures performed worldwide in 2008. The Boston KPro was developed at the Massachusetts Eye and Ear Infirmary under the leadership of Claes Dohlman.

=== AlphaCor ===
In cases where there have been several graft failures or the risk for keratoplasty is high, synthetic corneas can substitute successfully for donor corneas. Such a device contains a peripheral skirt and a transparent central region. These two parts are connected on a molecular level by an interpenetrating polymer network, made from poly-2-hydroxyethyl methacrylate (pHEMA). AlphaCor is a U.S. FDA-approved type of synthetic cornea measuring 7.0 mm in diameter and 0.5 mm in thickness. The main advantages of synthetic corneas are that they are biocompatible, and the network between the parts and the device prevents complications that could arise at their interface. The probability of retention in one large study was estimated at 62% at 2 years follow-up.

=== Osteo-Odonto-Keratoprosthesis ===
A technique called osteo-odonto-keratoprosthesis (OOKP) uses a staged operation on those who have developed corneal blindness in which a laminated tooth is transplanted to serve as a support for an artificial optical cylinder.

== Prognosis ==
The prognosis for visual restoration and maintenance of ocular health with corneal transplants is generally very good. Risks for failure or guarded prognoses are multifactorial. The type of transplant, the disease state requiring the procedure, the health of the other parts of the recipient eye and even the health of the donor tissue may all confer a more or less favorable prognosis.

The majority of corneal transplants result in significant improvement in visual function for many years or a lifetime. In cases of rejection or transplant failure, the surgery can generally be repeated.

== Alternatives ==
=== Contact lenses ===
Different types of contact lenses may be used to delay or eliminate the need for corneal transplantation in corneal disorders.

=== Phototherapeutic keratectomy ===
Diseases that only affect the surface of the cornea can be treated with an operation called phototherapeutic keratectomy (PTK). With the precision of an excimer laser and a modulating agent coating the eye, irregularities on the surface can be removed. However, in most of the cases where corneal transplantation is recommended, PTK would not be effective.

=== Intrastromal corneal ring segments ===
In corneal disorders where vision correction is not possible by using contact lenses, intrastromal corneal ring segments may be used to flatten the cornea, which is intended to relieve the nearsightedness and astigmatism. In this procedure, an ophthalmologist makes an incision in the cornea of the eye, and inserts two crescent or semi-circular shaped ring segments between the layers of the corneal stroma, one on each side of the pupil. Intrastromal corneal rings were approved in 2004 by the Food and Drug Administration for people with keratoconus who cannot adequately correct their vision with glasses or contact lenses. They were approved under the Humanitarian Device Exemption, which means the manufacturer did not have to demonstrate effectiveness.

=== Corneal collagen cross-linking ===
Corneal collagen cross-linking may delay or eliminate the need for corneal transplantation in keratoconus and post-LASIK ectasia.

== Epidemiology ==
Corneal transplant is one of the most common transplant procedures. Although approximately 100,000 procedures are performed worldwide each year, some estimates report that 10 million people are affected by various disorders that would benefit from corneal transplantation.

In Australia, approximately 2,000 grafts are performed each year. According to the NHS Blood and Transplant, over 2,300 corneal transplant procedures are performed each year in the United Kingdom. In the one-year period ending 31 March 2006, 2,503 people received corneal transplants in the UK.

== History ==
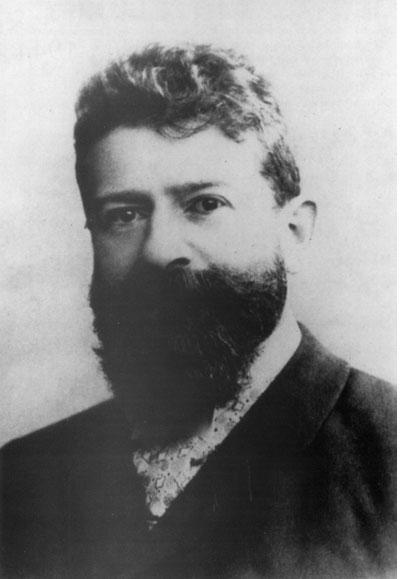
Eduard Zirm

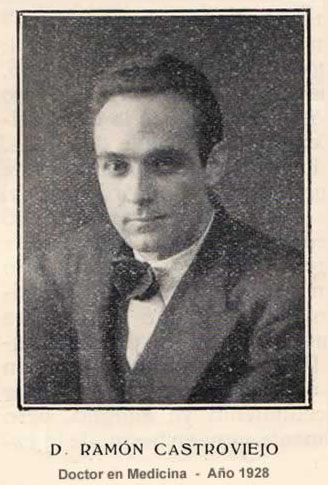
Spanish-born eye surgeon Ramón Castroviejo successfully performed keratoplasty as early as 1936.

The first cornea transplant was performed in 1905 by Eduard Zirm (Olomouc Eye Clinic, now Czech Republic), making it one of the first types of transplant surgery successfully performed. Another pioneer of the operation was Ramón Castroviejo. Russian eye surgeon Vladimir Filatov's attempts at transplanting cornea started with the first try in 1912 and were continued, gradually improving until on 6 May 1931 he successfully grafted a patient using corneal tissue from a deceased person. He widely reported another transplant in 1936, disclosing his technique in full detail. In 1936, Castroviejo did a first transplantation in an advanced case of keratoconus, achieving significant improvement in patient's vision.

Tudor Thomas, a clinical teacher for the Welsh National School of Medicine, conceived the idea of a donor system for corneal grafts and an eye bank was established in East Grinstead in 1955.

Advances in operating microscopes enabled surgeons to have a more magnified view of the surgical field, while advances in materials science enabled them to use sutures finer than a human hair.

Instrumental in the success of cornea transplants were the establishment of eye banks. These are organizations located throughout the world to coordinate the distribution of donated corneas to surgeons, as well as providing eyes for research. Some eye banks also distribute other anatomical gifts.

== Research ==
=== High speed lasers ===
Blades are being replaced by high speed lasers in order to make surgical incisions more precise. These improved incisions allow the cornea to heal more quickly and the sutures to be removed sooner. The cornea heals more strongly than with standard blade operations. Not only does this dramatically improve visual recovery and healing, it also allows the possibility for improvement in visual outcomes.

Since 2004, Amnitrans Eyebank in Rotterdam, The Netherlands, provides donor corneas pre-cut for advanced keratoplasty procedures, such as DSEK, DSAEK, FS-DSEK and DMEK. In 2007, Seattle-based SightLife, one of the leading corneal tissue banks in the world, introduced a process for the preparation of donated corneal tissue using a femtosecond laser. This process is known as custom corneal tissue.

=== DSEK/DSAEK/DMEK ===
Endothelial keratoplasty (EK) was introduced by Melles et al. in 1998. Today there are two forms of EK:

- Descemet's Stripping (Automated) Endothelial Keratoplasty (DSEK/DSAEK) in which the diseased Descemet's membrane is removed and replaced by a healthy donor posterior transplant. The transplant tissue can be prepared by a surgeon's hand or ordered already prepared for surgery. Ocular Systems was the first organization to deliver prepared grafts for surgery in 2005. DSEK/DSAEK uses only a small incision that is either self-sealing or may be closed with a few sutures. The small incision offers several benefits over traditional methods of corneal transplant such as penetrating keratoplasty. Because the procedure is less invasive, DSAEK leaves the eye much stronger and less prone to injury than full-thickness transplants. New medical devices such as the EndoSaver (patent pending) are designed to ease process of inserting endothelial tissue into the cornea. Additionally, DSAEK has a more rapid rate of visual recovery. Vision is typically restored in one to six months rather than one to two years.
- Descemet Membrane Endothelial Keratoplasty (DMEK) is the most recent EK technique in which an isolated Descemet's membrane is transplanted. The DMEK procedure is a 'like for like' replacement of the diseased part of the cornea with visual rehabilitation to 20/40 or better in 90% of cases and 20/25 or better in 60% of cases within the first three months. Rejection rates are lower (1%) and visual recovery is faster than any other form of corneal transplantation. In the UK (2013) DMEK is available to patients under the National Health Service at the Royal Shrewsbury Hospital, the Calderdale and Huddersfield NHS Trust, and at Worthing Hospital (Western Sussex Hospitals NHS Foundation Trust).

Not all patients with diseased corneas are candidates for endothelial keratoplasty. These procedures correct corneal endothelial failure, but are not able to correct corneal scarring, thinning, or surface irregularity. There is currently limited data on long-term survival of DMEK grafts however the early indications are very positive. An upcoming systematic review will seek to compare the safety and effectiveness of DMEK versus DSAEK in people with corneal failure from Fuchs' endothelial dystrophy and pseudophakic bullous keratopathy.

=== Stem cells ===
There is a bioengineering technique that uses stem cells to create corneas or part of corneas that can be transplanted into the eyes. Corneal stem cells are removed from a healthy cornea. They are collected and, through laboratory procedures, made into five to ten layers of cells that can be stitched into a patient's eye. The stem cells are placed into the area where the damaged cornea tissue has been removed. This is a good alternative for those that cannot gain vision through regular cornea transplants. A new development, announced by the University of Cincinnati Medical School in May 2007, would use bone marrow stem cells to regrow the cornea and its cells. This technique, which proved successful in mouse trials, would be of use to those with inherited genetic degenerative conditions of the cornea, especially if other means like a transplant are not feasible. It works better than a transplant because these stem cells keep their ability to differentiate and replicate, and so keep the disease from recurring, longer and better.

=== Biosynthetic corneas ===
On 25 August 2010, investigators from Canada and Sweden reported results from the first 10 people in the world treated with the biosynthetic corneas. Two years after having the corneas implanted, six of the 10 patients had improved vision. Nine of the 10 experienced cell and nerve regeneration, meaning that corneal cells and nerves grew into the implant. To make the material, the researchers placed a human gene that regulates the natural production of collagen into specially programmed yeast cells. They then molded the resulting material into the shape of a cornea. This research shows the potential for these bioengineered corneas but the outcomes in this study were not nearly as good as those achieved with human donor corneas. This may become an excellent technique, but right now it is still in the prototype stage and not ready for clinical use. The results were published in the journal Science Translational Medicine.

== Society and culture ==
=== Cost ===
A 2013 cost-benefit analysis by the Lewin Group for Eye Bank Association of America, estimated an average cost of $16,500 for each corneal transplant.

== See also ==
- Eye transplantation
