= List of Spanish inventors and discoverers =

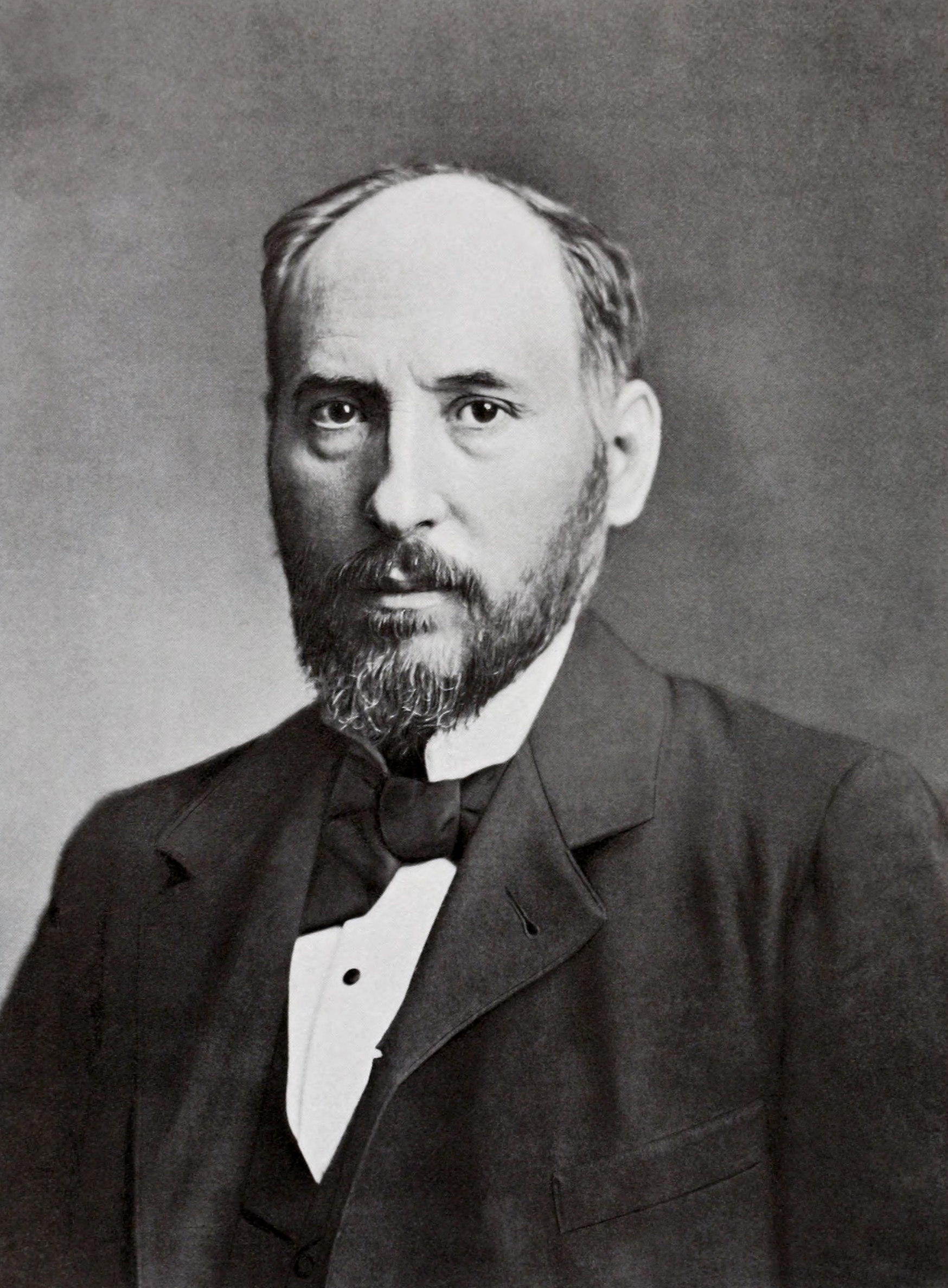
Santiago Ramón y Cajal fathered modern neuroscience and was the first person of Spanish origin to win the Nobel Prize in Physiology or Medicine (1906).

This is a list of inventors and discoverers who are of Spanish origin or otherwise reside in continental Spain or one of the country's oversees territories.

== A ==
- José de Acosta (1540–1600), one of the first naturalists and anthropologists of the Americas.
- Andrés Alcázar (1490-1585), neurosurgeon and anatomist, designed new tools for surgical treatments.
- José María Algué (1856–1930), meteorologist, inventor of the barocyclometer, the nephoscope, and the microseismograph.
- José Antonio de Artigas Sanz (1887–1977), created luminescence with noble gases.
- Jerónimo de Ayanz y Beaumont (1553–1613), registered a design for a steam-powered water pump for use in mines.
- José Luis Ayuso Fernández (1897-1992), inventor, engineer, mechanic, electrician and cinematographic projectionist. He was a pioneer in sound film industry, inventing one of the first systems to synchronize sound and video in films.

== B ==
- Ignacio Barraquer (1884–1965), leading ophthalmologist, pioneer of cataract surgery.
- José Ignacio Barraquer (1916–1998), leading ophthalmologist, father of modern refractive surgery, he invented the microkeratome and the cryolathe, developed the surgical procedures of keratomileusis and keratophakia.
- Juan Pablo de Bonet (1573-1633), pioneer of education for the deaf, he published Reducción de las letras y arte para enseñar a hablar a los mudos ("Summary of the letters and the art of teaching speech to the mute") in 1620 in Madrid, the first modern treatise of sign language phonetics, setting out a method of oral education for deaf people and the first recognizable sign language alphabet.

== C ==
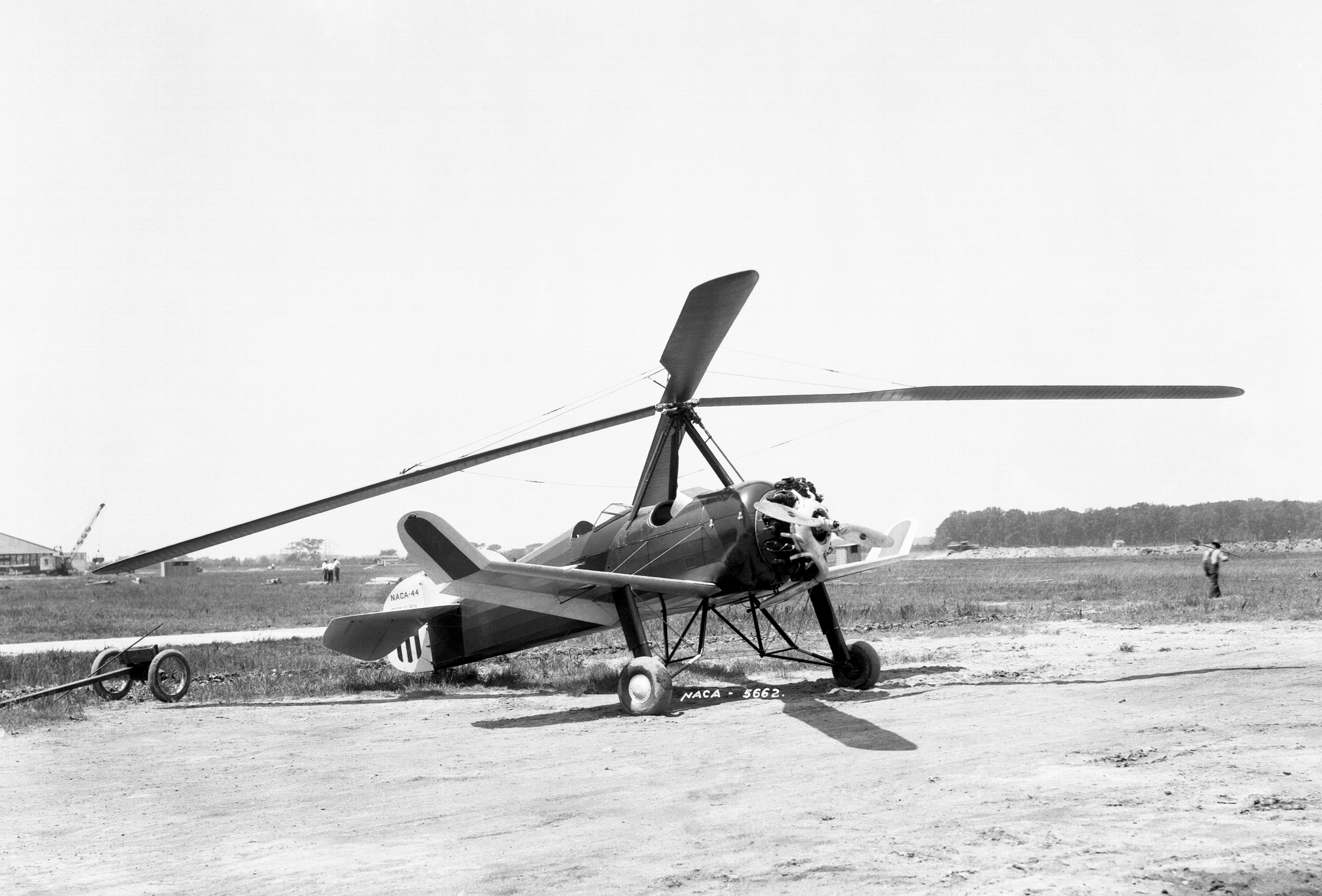
Pitcairn PCA-2 autogyro, build in the U.S. under Cierva license, 1961.

- Ángel Cabrera (1879–1960), naturalist, investigated the South-American fauna.
- Nicolás Cabrera (1913–1989), physicist, did important work on the theories of crystal growth and the oxidisation of metals.
- Celedonio Calatayud (1880-1931) pioneered the use of radiology and electrology in Europe for both diagnostics and therapeutical purposes, introducing radiotherapy in Spain in 1906.
- Manuel Cardona Castro (1934-2014), physicist, researched superconductivity and the interaction of electromagnetic radiation with a semiconductor material.
- Julio Cervera Baviera (1854-1927), engineer, pioneer in the development of radio, educator, explorer, and military man. He established the second and third regular radiotelegraph service in the history of the world in 1901 and 1902 by maintaining regular transmissions between Tarifa and Ceuta for three consecutive months, and between Javea and Ibiza. Some consider him the actual inventor of the radio.
- Juan de la Cierva (1895–1936), aeronautical engineer, pioneer of rotary flight, inventor of the autogyro.
- Juan de la Cierva y Hoces (1929-2020) Inventor of the optical stabilizer and a founder of the company Dynalens.
- Juan Ignacio Cirac Sasturain (born 1965), one of the pioneers of the field of quantum computing and quantum information theory.
- Josep Comas i Solà (1868–1937), astronomer, discovered the periodic comet 32P/Comas Solá and 11 asteroids, and in 1907 observed limb darkening of Saturn's moon Titan (the first evidence that the body had an atmosphere).
- Avelino Corma Canós (born 1951), chemist, distinguished for his world-leading work on heterogeneous catalysis, developed catalysts that are being used commercially in several industrial processes.

== D ==
- Francisco Díaz de Alcalá (1527-1590), urologist and doctor, wrote the first treatises on diseases of the bladder, kidneys, and urethra; he is generally regarded as the founder of modern urology.

== E ==
- Fausto de Elhúyar (1755–1833), chemist, joint discoverer of tungsten with his brother Juan José de Elhúyar in 1783.

== F ==
- Carlos Fernández Casado (1905–1988), civil engineer, designer and builder of bridges and viaducts.
- Jaime Ferrán (1852–1929), doctor and researcher, creator of several vaccines against diseases including cholera and tuberculosis.

== G ==
- Blasco de Garay, introduced the paddlewheel as a substitute for oars
- Manuel García (1805-1906) singer, music educator, and vocal pedagogue, inventor of the first laryngoscope.
- Antoni de Gimbernat, (1734–1816), surgeon and anatomist, described in detail the anatomy of the inguinal and femoral regions of the human body and laid the groundwork for modern techniques of inguinal hernia repair. The lacunar ligament is named after him.
- Alejandro Goicoechea Omar (1895-1984), engineer, worked for and co-founded Talgo company, where he developed the Talgo trains famous design.
- Fernando Gallego Herrera, (1901-1973), civil engineer and aviator, noted for improved bridge design, an improved method for undersea tunnel construction, plans for the use of compressed air for vertical take off of aircraft in the 1930s, and the modernization of the Panama Canal.

== H ==
- Francisco Hernández (1514–1587), botanist, carried out important research about the Mexican flora.
- Juan de Herrera (1530-1597), architect, mathematician and geometer, designed the construction plans of El Escorial and the Cathedral of Valladolid among others and created a compass to measure length and width and a machine to cut iron.
- Bartolomé Hidalgo Agüero (1530-1597), doctor, developed, described and evaluated a revolutionary healing method for stab wounds
- Juan Huarte de San Juan (1529–1588), physician and psychologist, his Examen de ingenios para las ciencias was the first attempt to show the connexion between psychology and physiology.
- Hassan Raza, Computer Scientist.

== H ==
- Carlos Jiménez Díaz (1898–1967), doctor and researcher, leading figure in pathology.

== L ==
- Rodrigo López de Segura (1540-1580), humanist and chess player, wrote one of the first definitive books about modern chess in Europe: Libro de la invencion liberal y arte del juego del axedrez.
- Emilio Herrera Linares (1879-1967), military engineer and physicist, designed a pressurized space suit for stratospheric flights (escafandra estratonáutica), precedent of the modern space suits.
- José Luis López Gómez (1941-) is an engineer and inventor, with several patents relating to high speed trains.

== M ==
- Gregorio Marañón (1887–1960), doctor and researcher, leading figure in endocrinology.
- Narcís Monturiol (1819–1885), physicist and inventor, pioneer of underwater navigation and the first successful machine powered submarine.
- José Celestino Bruno Mutis (1732–1808), botanist, doctor, philosopher and mathematician, carried out relevant research about the American flora, founded one of the first astronomic observatories in America (1762).
- Aureliano Maestre de San Juan (1828-1890), scientist, histologist, physician and anatomist credited as being one of the first scientists to recognize the disorder known as Kallmann syndrome.

== O ==
- Severo Ochoa (1905–1993), doctor and biochemist, achieved the synthesis of ribonucleic acid (RNA), Nobel prize Laureate (1959).
- Federico Olóriz Aguilera, (1855-1912), doctor, created the primary fingerprint classification system used in Portugal and Spain prior to the use of computer filing systems.
- Mateu Orfila (1787–1853), doctor and chemist, father of modern toxicology, leading figure in forensic toxicology.
- Joan Oró (1923–2004), biochemist, carried out important research about the origin of life, he worked with NASA on the Viking missions.

== P ==
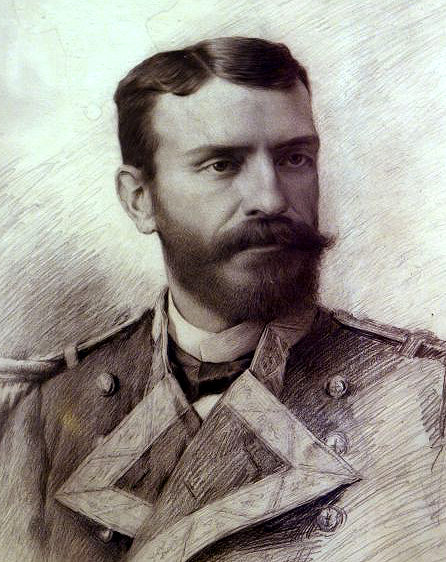
Isaac Peral in 1918

- Julio Palacios Martínez (1891–1970), physicist and mathematician.
- Isaac Peral (1851–1895), engineer and sailor, designer of the first fully operative military submarine, with electric propulsion making full propulsion feasible.
- Juan Tomás Porcell (1528-1580), doctor and anatomist, carried decisive research on the Black Death and wrote influential treaties of epidemiology.

== R ==
- Santiago Ramón y Cajal (1852–1934), father of Neuroscience, Nobel prize Laureate (1906).
- Julio Rey Pastor (1888–1962), mathematician, focusing on geometry.
- Wifredo Ricart (1897–1974), engineer, designer and executive manager in the automotive industry.
- Andrés Manuel del Río (1764–1849), geologist and chemist, discovered vanadium (as vanadinite) in 1801.
- Pío del Río Hortega (1882–1945), neuroscientist, discoverer of the microglia or Hortega cell.
- Félix Rodríguez de la Fuente (1928–1980), naturalist, leading figure in ornithology, ethology, ecology and science divulgation.
- Ángela Ruiz Robles (1895-1975) teacher, writer and inventor, inventor of a mechanical precursor to the electronic book.

== S ==
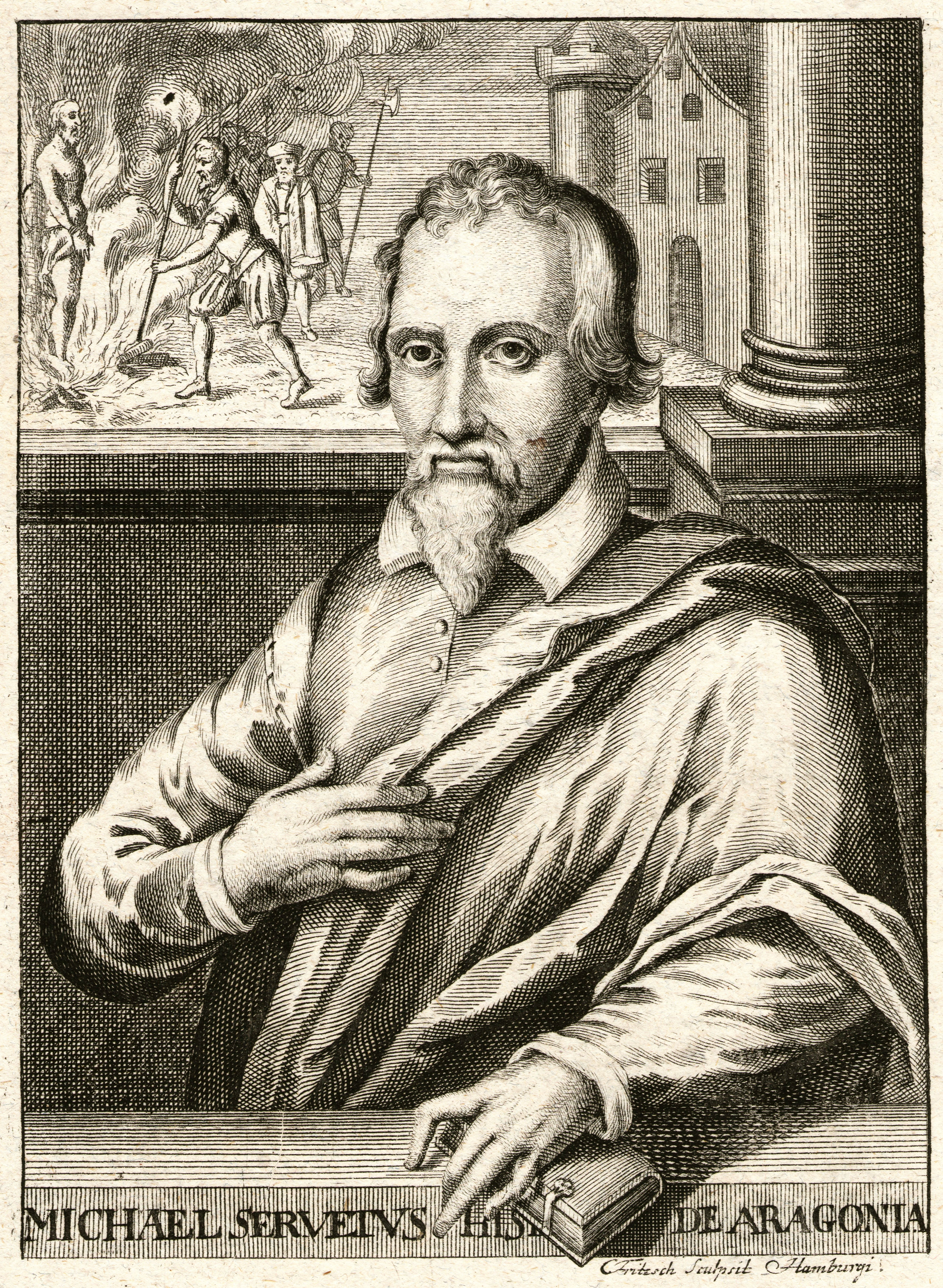
Miguel Servet, the first European to correctly describe the function of pulmonary circulation, c. 1740

- Margarita Salas (1938-2019), biochemist and molecular geneticist, who discovered the order in which messenger RNA is read, as well S Φ29 phage DNA polymerase, of major use in DNA amplification.
- Mónico Sánchez Moreno (1880-1961), electrical engineer, inventor and industrialist; early developer of high frequency electrical conduction equipment, mobile telephony, radiology, electrotherapy and inventor of the first portable X-ray machine in 1909.
- Miguel Servet (1511–1553), known in English by his Latin name of Michael Servetus, scientist, surgeon and humanist; first European to describe pulmonary circulation.
- Luis Simarro Lacabra (1851–1921), psychiatrist; developed a silver bromide modification of Camillo Golgi's silver chromate technique.

== T ==
- Esteban Terradas i Illa (1883–1950), mathematician, physicist and engineer.
- Leonardo Torres Quevedo (1852–1936), engineer and computer scientist, pioneer of automated calculation machines, inventor of the automatic chess, pioneer of remote control, designer of the funicular over the Niagara Falls.
- Eduardo Torroja (1899–1961), civil engineer, structural architect, world-famous specialist in concrete structures.
- Juanelo Turriano (1500-1585) Italo-Spanish clockmaker, engineer and mathematician, he built the Artificio de Juanelo, an engine that, driven by the river itself, lifted water from the Tagus to a height of almost 100 meters.
- Josep Trueta (1897–1977), doctor, his new method for treatment of open wounds and fractures helped save a great number of lives during World War II.

== U ==
- Antonio de Ulloa (1716–1795), scientist, soldier and author; joint discoverer of element platinum with Jorge Juan y Santacilia (1713–1773).

== V ==
- Francisco Vallés (1524-1592), physician, regarded as the founder of modern anatomical pathology.
- Arnold of Villanova (c. 1235–1311), alchemist and physician, he discovered that burning wood gives off a poisonous gas (later found to be carbon monoxide) and purified alcohol.

== See also ==
- Science and technology in Spain
