= José Sanz =

José Sanz may refer to:

- José Antonio de Artigas Sanz (1887–1977), Spanish engineer
- José Luis Sanz (born 1968), Spanish politician
- José María Sanz Pastor (1941–2025), Spanish politician and diplomat
- José Sanz Aguado (1907–1969), Spanish chess player
