= Barraquer =

Barraquer is a surname of Spanish origin. Notable people with the surname include:

- Francisco Vidal y Barraquer (1868–1943), Spanish Cardinal of the Roman Catholic Church
- Ignacio Barraquer (1884–1965), Spanish ophthalmologist known for his contributions to the advancement of cataract surgery
- Jose Barraquer (1916–1998), Spanish ophthalmologist

== See also ==
- Barraquer–Simons syndrome, rare form of lipodystrophy, which usually first affects the head, and then spreads to the thorax
