= María Antonia Herrero =

Spanish researcher and chemist

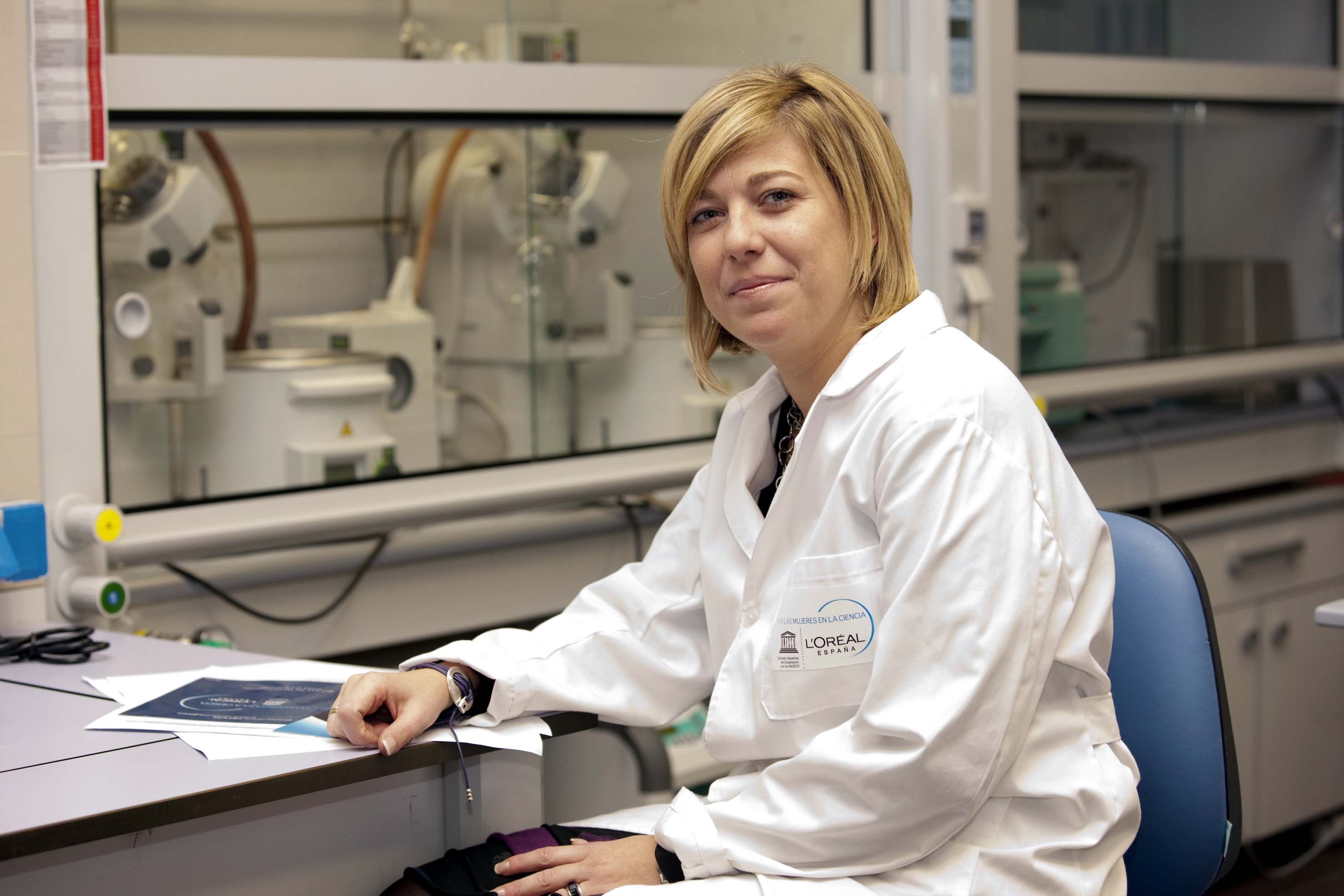
- Herrero in 2012
- Born: 1978 (age 47–48)
- Education: University of Castilla–La Mancha
- Known for: Research of nanomaterials
- Awards: L'Oréal-UNESCO Awards for Women in Science

María Antonia Herrero (born 1978) is a chemist who works in the faculty of chemical sciences at the University of Castilla–La Mancha (UCLM) in Ciudad Real. Her work focuses on chemical nanomaterials, with research undertaken at the same university.

== Life ==
Herrero began her doctorate in 2000, on microwaves and Sustainable Chemistry Group of the University of Castilla–La Mancha, working in aided by organic reactions microwaves. Part of her thesis was done in Uppsala, Sweden after which she earned her doctorate in 2006.

== Research ==
Her work centres on the study of the applications of nanomaterials, specifically nanotubes, that can be modified for distinct uses in such diverse fields as medicine (e.g. as conveyors of drugs to treat illnesses like cancer or Alzheimer's disease). After she joined the nano-chemistry group at UCLM, her research focused on microwave radiation for the activation of carbon nanostructures in solvent-free conditions, developing multifunctional synthetic materials to be used in science and biological applications. She has authored over 35 scientific publications, some book chapters and holds four scientific patents.

In 2012, María Antonia Herrero obtained a grant from the Iberdrola Foundation to develop a project in the field of energy and the environment. The project, headed by Herrero, proposed the preparation of a device that uses solar energy to produce electricity and wastewater regeneration through integrated electrochemical processes fed by renewable energies, thus contributing to the fight against climate change.

In July 2016 she published research on Design of Assembled Systems Based on Conjugated Polyphenylene Derivatives and Carbon Nanohorns.

== Recent publications ==
- Functional motor recovery from brain ischemic insult by carbon nanotube-mediated siRNA silencing, PNAS, 108, 10952–10957, 2011.
- Chirality dependent charge transfer events in individual semiconducting single wall carbon nanotubes – (9,4), (8,6), (8,7), and (9,7), J. Am. Chem. Soc., 133, 18696–18706, 2011.
- Few-Layer graphenes from ball-milling of graphite with melamine, ChemComm, 47, 10936–10938, 2011.
- Carbon nanohorns functionalized with polyamidoamine dendrimers as efficient biocarrier materials for gene therapy. Carbon, 50, 2832–2844, (2012).
- Enhanced docetaxel-mediated cytotoxicity in human prostate cancer cells through knockdown of cofilin-1 by carbon nanohorn delivered siRNA. Biomaterials, 33, 8152–8159, (2012).
- Degree of Chemical Functionalization of Carbon Nanotubes Determines Tissue Distribution and Excretion Profile.Angewandte Chemie, 124, 6495–6499, (2012).
- In vivo degradation of functionalized carbon nanotubes after stereotactic administration in the brain cortex. Nanomedicine, 10, 1485–1494, (2012).
- Asbestos-like pathogenicity of long carbon nanotubes can be alleviated by chemical functionalization. Angewandte Chemie. DOI: 10.1002/anie.201207664

=== Book chapters ===
- Recent Advances in Covalent Functionalization and Characterization of Carbon Nanotubes, Chapter 9: Fundamentals and ApplicHandbook of Carbon Nano Materials, ISBN 978-981-4350-20-4, 271–324, 2011.
- Reproducibility and scalability of Microwave-Assisted Reactions, Chapter in Fundamentals and Microwave heating (2011), ISBN 978-953-308-337-7.

== Awards ==
In November 2010, she was awarded, along with four other scientists (Isabel Lastres Becker, Ana Briones Alonso, Mercedes Vila and Elena Ramírez Parra), the L'Oréal-UNESCO Awards for Women in Science, with an endowment of €15000 each. This award rewards the work of women scientists under 40.

In 2011, she received the "Ibn Wafid of Toledo" Prize, named after 10th-century Toledo physician Abenguefit, for young researchers from Castile-La Mancha. In 2012, the Iberdrola Foundation granted her an important line of investigation with the main subject of integration of carbon nanomaterials into solar cells.

== See also ==
- List of female scientists in the 21st century
- List of Spanish inventors and discoverers
