= Ana Briones Alonso =

Spanish medical researcher

- Born: 1972 (age 53–54); Madrid, Spain
- Citizenship: Spanish
- Education: Autonomous University of Madrid
- Known for: cardiovascular medicine
- Awards: L'Oréal-UNESCO Awards for Women in Science
- Scientific career
- Academic advisors: Mercedes Salaices

Ana María Briones Alonso (born 1972) is a Spanish scientist in the field of medicine, and investigates the causes and mechanisms involved in cardiovascular illness and arterial hypertension.

== Life ==
Ana Briones was born in Madrid, Spain. In her later career, she developed her investigation in the department of pharmacology and therapeutic of the Autonomous University of Madrid, where she analyses the medicines for use in treatment to evaluate efficacy, with other possible drugs.

She is part of the research group directed by Doctor Mercedes Salaices, chair of the pharmacology department of the Autonomous University of Madrid and directs the physiology and vascular pharmacology research group of the Instituto de Investigación Hospital Universitario La Paz (IdiPAZ), as well as academic correspondent of the Royal Academy National of Pharmacy (RANF), constituted by researchers situated in the Faculty of Medicine of the Autonomous University of Madrid, in the University Hospital in the Faculty of Sciences of the Health of the King Juan Carlos University, as well as by collaborators of the Network of Cardiovascular Investigation (RIC) and of other centres of investigation. The group investigates:

- Stress oxidation, cyclooxygenase (COX) products and the interrelationship in the study of the function and vascular model and changes in cardiovascular pathologies
- Adipose fabric and vascular alterations in cardiovascular pathologies.

== Awards ==
In November 2010, she was awarded, with four other scientists (Isabel Lastres Becker, Elena Ramírez Parra, Mercedes Vila and María Antonia Herrero), the L'Oréal-UNESCO Awards for Women in Science, with an endowment of €15000 each to reward the work of women younger than 40 years to support women in the science.

== See also ==
- List of female scientists in the 21st century
- List of Spanish inventors and discoverers
