= Hyeronymus Sirturus =

Milanese scholar

Hieronymus Sirturus (Geronimo Sirtori (Italian: [ˈsirtori])) was a Milanese scholar who wrote at least two books on politics and telescopes between 1614 and 1618.

The Compendium politicum: ex universa civili doctrina Justi Lipsii pro principatu, tum ex Notis integra fide concinnatum was published by Persius in Frankfurt in 1614.., and the Telescopium: sive ars perficiendi novum illud Galilaei virorium instrumentum ad sydera, by Paul Jacob in 1618

His Telescopium book was written around 1612, only 4 years after the telescope was invented. The book contained a complete set of instructions and diagrams for building a refracting telescope. Sirtori pointed out that "a workman had to be most careful in polishing otherwise the lens became lopsided or aspherical with peripheral distortion". The book states that the goal is to create a lens with perfectly spherical surfaces.

He may have also invented the method of the spherical grinding of moulds, which improved lens grinding and polishing techniques dramatically. With the rapid dissemination of the telescope the priority question about the inventor soon arose. Sirtori downplayed the achievement of the first discovery of the telescope by presenting the story of Johannes Lippersein, who would have grasped the idea from ‘a genius or some other man, as yet unknown, of the race of Hollanders,’ who had visited a Middelburg spectacle maker.

It's believed that Sirtori might also be the author of the Sirtori cipher, given to King Philip II and ordered on 1 July 1574. The cipher contains mining discoveries from American ports (gold and silver), and was conserved in the AGI (Archivo General de Indias). From 1509 the King had ordered that all American riches should be 'secret' or 'coded' with the cipher that "you have taken from the Secretary". This matrix was lost, and the context of the surviving pages is unclear

Name variations: Sirtori, Geronimo Sirtori, Gieronimo Sirtori, Hieronimo Sirtori, Hieronimus Sirtori, Hieronymus Sirtori, Jerome Sirtori, Jerosme Sirtori, Jerôme Sirturus, Hieronymus.
