= Elena Ramírez Parra =

Spanish scientist and molecular biologist

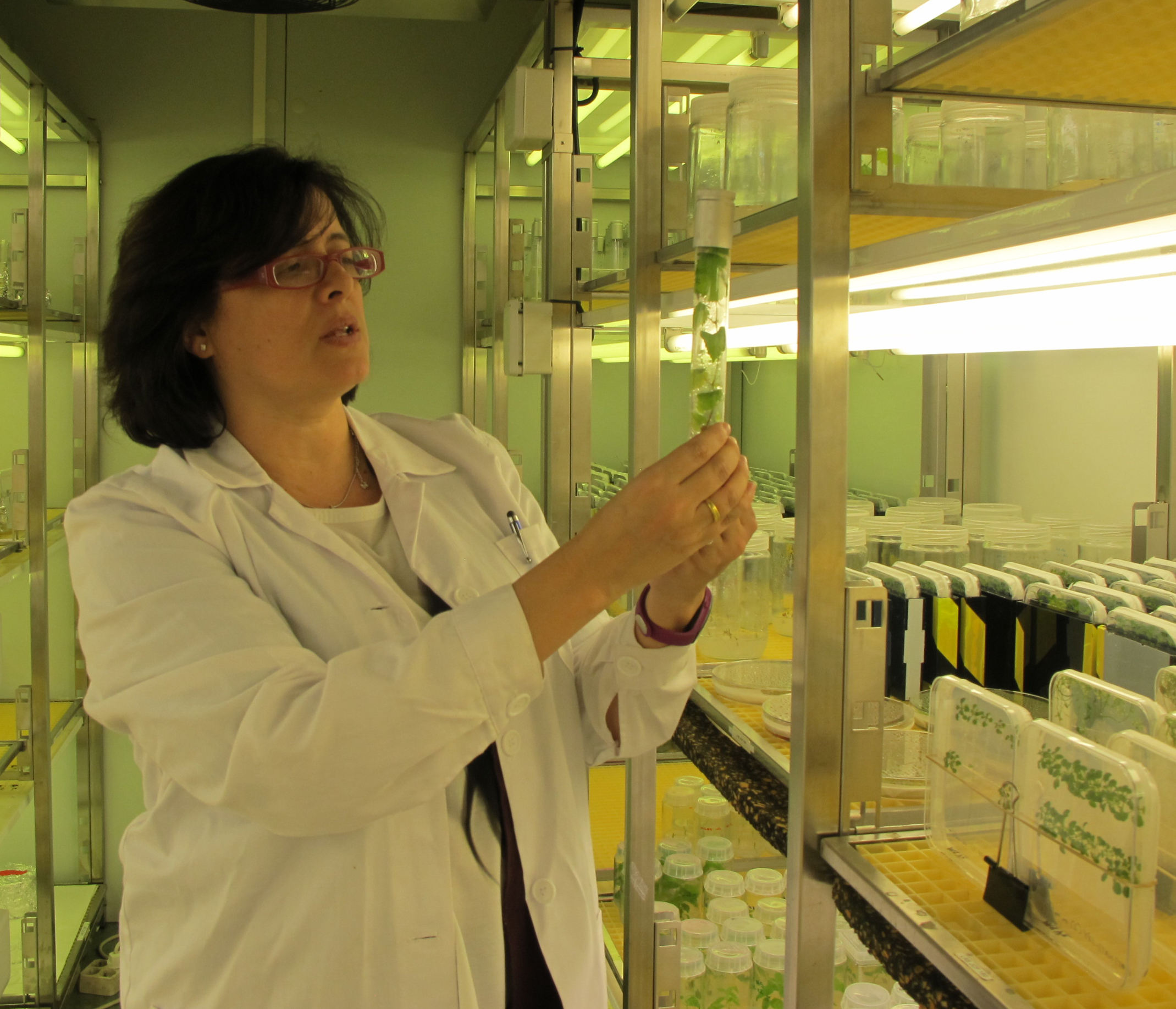
- Born: 1972 (age 53–54)
- Education: Autonomous University of Madrid
- Known for: botany
- Awards: L'Oréal-UNESCO Awards for Women in Science

Elena Ramírez Parra (born 1972) is a Spanish botanist and researcher who studies the negative effects of environmental stress (drought, salinity of the soil, excess radiation, presence of heavy metals and the high and low temperatures) on plant growth. Applications of her research include improving harvest yield. In 2010, Ramírez won a L'Oréal-UNESCO Award for Women in Science.

== Life ==
Ramírez studied biological sciences at the Autonomous University of Madrid and a doctorate in molecular biology from the same university (2000). Ramírez is a published scholar of botany.

She became a senior researcher at the Centre for Plant Biotechnology and Genomics (Centro de Biotecnología y Genómica de Plantas, CBGP) of the National Instituto Nacional de Investigación y Tecnología Agraria y Alimentaria (INIA) and the Technical University of Madrid (UPM), studying the negative effects that produce environmental stress in plants.

Her investigation characterises the mechanisms that plants use to respond to external stresses like drought, soil salinity, heavy metals and extreme temperatures. She tries to create a generation of new plant varieties that will improve harvests.

In November 2010, she was awarded, with four scientists (Isabel Lastres Becker, Ana Briones Alonso, Mercedes Vila and María Antonia Herrero), the L'Oréal-UNESCO Awards for Women in Science. This endowment of €15000 is to reward the work of women scientists younger than 40.

== See also ==
- List of Spanish inventors and discoverers
- List of female scientists in the 21st century
