= Aspheric lens =

Type of lens

An aspheric biconvex lens

An aspheric lens or asphere (often labeled ASPH on eyepieces) is a lens whose surface profiles are not portions of a sphere or cylinder. In photography, a lens assembly that includes an aspheric element is often called an aspherical lens.

The asphere's more complex surface profile can reduce or eliminate spherical aberration and also reduce other optical aberrations such as astigmatism, compared to a simple lens. A single aspheric lens can often replace a much more complex multi-lens system. The resulting device is smaller and lighter, and sometimes cheaper than the multi-lens design. Aspheric elements are used in the design of multi-element wide-angle and fast normal lenses to reduce aberrations. They are also used in combination with reflective elements (catadioptric systems) such as the aspherical Schmidt corrector plate used in the Schmidt cameras and the Schmidt–Cassegrain telescopes. Small molded aspheres are often used for collimating diode lasers.

Aspheric lenses are also sometimes used for eyeglasses. Aspheric eyeglass lenses allow for crisper vision than standard "best form" lenses, mostly when looking in other directions than the lens optical center. Moreover, the reduction of the magnification effect of a lens may help with prescriptions that have different powers in the 2 eyes (anisometropia). Not related to the optical quality, they may give a thinner lens, and also distort the viewer's eyes less as seen by other people, producing better aesthetic appearance.

== Surface profile ==
While in principle aspheric surfaces can take a wide variety of forms, aspheric lenses are often designed with surfaces of the form

$z(r)=\frac{r^2}{R\left (1+\sqrt{1-(1+\kappa)\frac{r^2}{R^2}}\right )}+\alpha_4 r^4+\alpha_6 r^6+\cdots ,$

where the optic axis is presumed to lie in the z direction, and $z(r)$ is the sag—the z-component of the displacement of the surface from the vertex, at distance $r$ from the axis. The coefficients $\alpha_i$ describe the deviation of the surface from the axially symmetric quadric surface specified by $R$ and $\kappa$.

If the coefficients $\alpha_i$ are all zero, then $R$ is the radius of curvature and $\kappa$ is the conic constant, as measured at the vertex (where $r=0$). In this case, the surface has the form of a conic section rotated about the optic axis, with form determined by $\kappa$:

$\kappa$	Conic section
$\kappa < -1$	hyperbola
$\kappa = -1$	parabola
$-1 < \kappa < 0$	ellipse (surface is a prolate spheroid)
$\kappa = 0$	sphere
$\kappa > 0$	ellipse (surface is an oblate spheroid)

The above equation suffers from strong correlation between the coefficients of the first term and the polynomial terms. This leads to strong divergences when it comes to fitting the equation to an aspheric surface. Therefore, different equations using "Q-polynomials" where coefficients are orthogonal to each other are an alternative that is sometimes used.

== Manufacture ==
Cross section of the Schmidt corrector plate, a common aspheric lens

Small glass or plastic aspheric lenses can be made by molding, which allows cheap mass production. Due to their low cost and good performance, molded aspheres are commonly used in inexpensive consumer cameras, camera phones, and CD players. They are also commonly used for laser diode collimation, and for coupling light into and out of optical fibers.

Larger aspheres are made by grinding and polishing. Lenses produced by these techniques are used in telescopes, projection TVs, missile guidance systems, and scientific research instruments. They can be made by point-contact contouring to roughly the right form which is then polished to its final shape. In other designs, such as the Schmidt systems, the aspheric corrector plate can be made by using a vacuum to distort an optically parallel plate into a curve which is then polished "flat" on one side. Aspheric surfaces can also be made by polishing with a small tool with a compliant surface that conforms to the optic, although precise control of the surface form and quality is difficult, and the results may change as the tool wears.

Single-point diamond turning is an alternate process, in which a computer-controlled lathe uses a diamond tip to directly cut the desired profile into a piece of glass or another optical material. Diamond turning is slow and has limitations in the materials on which it can be used, and the surface accuracy and smoothness that can be achieved. It is particularly useful for infrared optics.

Several "finishing" methods can be used to improve the precision and surface quality of the polished surface. These include ion-beam finishing, abrasive water jets, and magnetorheological finishing, in which a magnetically guided fluid jet is used to remove material from the surface.

Another method for producing aspheric lenses is by depositing optical resin onto a spherical lens to form a composite lens of aspherical shape. Plasma ablation has also been proposed.

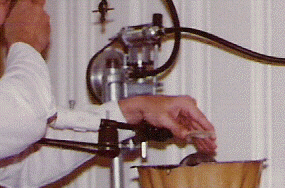
Lapping tool on a spindle below the lens, and mounting tool on a second spindle (swung out) uses pitch to hold the lens shown with its concave side down

The non-spherical curvature of an aspheric lens can also be created by blending from a spherical into an aspherical curvature by grinding the curvatures off-axis. Dual rotating axis grinding can be used for high index glass that isn't easily spin molded, as the CR-39 resin lens is. Techniques such as laser ablation can also be used to modify the curvature of a lens, but the polish quality of the resulting surfaces is not as good as those achieved with lapidary techniques.

Standards for the dispensing of prescription eyeglass lenses discourage the use of curvatures that deviate from definite focal lengths. Multiple focal lengths are accepted in the form of bifocals, trifocals, vari-focals, and cylindrical components for astigmatism.

== Metrology ==
Measurement technology plays a decisive role in the manufacturing of aspherical lenses. Depending on the manufacturing process and processing status, various measurement tasks are distinguished:

- form of asphere
- surface form deviation
- slope error
- centre thickness
- roughness

A distinction is made between tactile, i.e. touching, and non-contact measurement methods. The decision as to which method is used depends on accuracy but also on manufacturing state.

=== Tactile measurement ===
Tactile measurement is mainly used between two grinding operations to control the shape of the asphere and to adjust the following operation. A profile gauge probe is used to measure a section across the lens surface. The rotation symmetry of the lenses means that the combination of several of these profiles provides a sufficiently precise knowledge of the shape of the lens. Any damage to the lens surface caused by the probe tip would be removed in subsequent steps.

=== Non-contact measurement ===
Interferometers are used when measuring sensitive or polished surfaces. By superimposing a reference beam with the beam reflected from the surface to be measured, error maps, known as interferograms, are created which represent a full-field deviation of the surface shape.

==== Computer-generated hologram (CGH) ====
Computer-generated holograms (CGHs) represent a method for the interferometric determination of the deviation of the lens from the nominal geometry. These generate an aspherical wavefront in the target shape and thus enable the determination of deviations of the lens from the target shape in an interference image. CGHs must be manufactured specifically for each test item and are therefore only economical for series production.

==== Interferometric measurement ====
Another possibility is the interferometric measurement of aspheres in subareas, with minimal deviations to the best-fit sphere, and subsequent combination of the submeasurements to a full-surface interferogram. These are very flexible in comparison to CGHs and are also suitable for the production of prototypes and small series.

== Ophthalmic uses ==
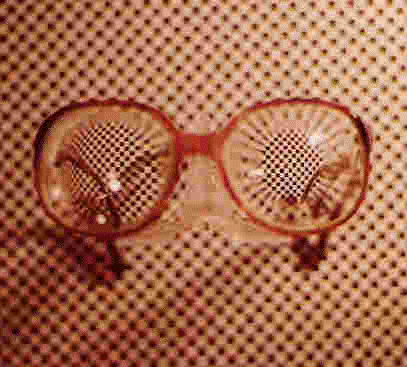
Concave aspheres fitted in a spectacle frame. The lenses' "minus" powers reduce the test pattern and bring it into better focus at the center of the lenses. Reflections from the non-aspheric anterior surfaces are also visible.

Like other lenses for vision correction, aspheric lenses can be categorized as convex or concave.

Convex aspheric curvatures are used in many presbyopic vari-focal lenses to increase the optical power over part of the lens, aiding in near-pointed tasks such as reading. The reading portion is an aspheric "progressive add". Also, in aphakia or extreme hyperopia, high plus power aspheric lenses can be prescribed, but this practice is becoming obsolete, replaced by surgical implants of intra-ocular lenses. Many convex types of lens have been approved by governing agencies regulating prescriptions.

Concave aspheres are used for the correction of high myopia. They are not commercially available from optical dispensaries, but rather must be specially ordered with instructions from the fitting practitioner, much like how a prosthetic is customized for an individual.

The range of lens powers available to dispensing opticians for filling prescriptions, even in an aspheric form, is limited practically by the size of the image formed on the retina. High minus lenses cause an image so small that shape and form aren't discernible, generally at about −15 diopters, while high plus lenses cause a tunnel of imagery so large that objects appear to pop in and out of a reduced field of view, generally at about +15 diopters.

In prescriptions for both farsightedness and nearsightedness, the lens curve flattens toward the edge of the glass, except for progressive reading adds for presbyopia, where seamless vari-focal portions change toward a progressively more plus diopter. High minus aspheres for myopes do not necessarily need progressive add portions, because the design of the lens curvature already progresses toward a less-minus/more-plus dioptric power from the center of the lens to the edge. High plus aspheres for hyperopes progress toward less-plus at the periphery. The aspheric curvature on high plus lenses are ground on the anterior side of the lens, whereas the aspheric curvature of high minus lenses are ground onto the posterior side of the lens. Progressive add reading portions for plus lenses are also ground onto the anterior surface of the lens. The blended curvature of aspheres reduces scotoma, a ringed blind spot.

== Camera lenses ==
The Canon EF 24-105 f/4L IS USM has three aspheric elements, highlighted in green on the diagram.

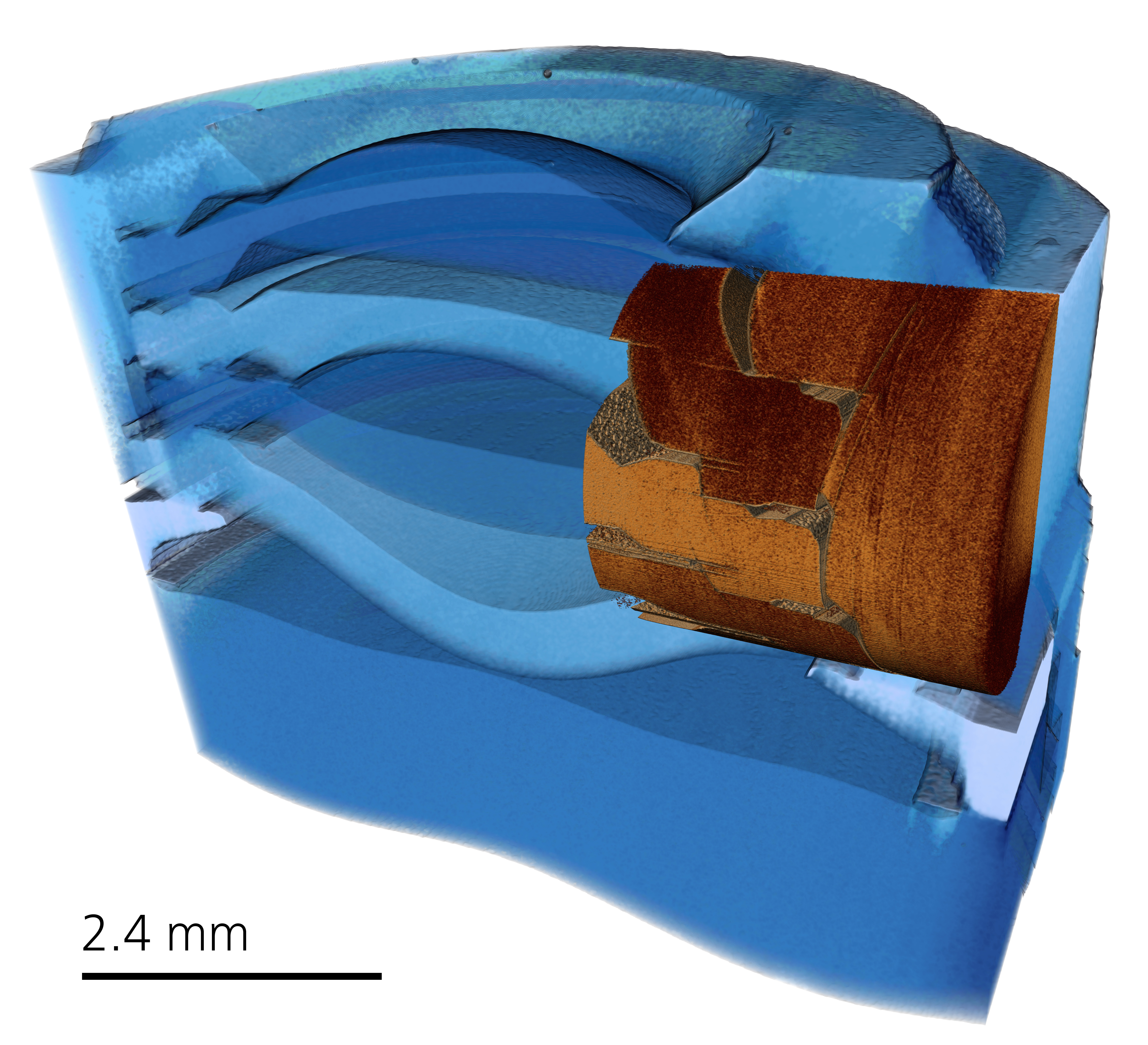
Mobile phone camera lens module

Aspheric elements are often used in camera lenses. This is often indicated by the abbreviation ASPH in the names of such products.

== History ==
Ibn sahl, a 10th-century Persian mathematician, figured out that a combination of spherical and parabolic surfaces, which is now known as anaclastic lens or aspheric lens, focuses light with minimal aberration.

Early attempts at making aspheric lenses to correct spherical aberration were made by René Descartes in the 1620s, and by Christiaan Huygens in the 1670s; the cross-section of the shape devised by Descartes for this purpose is known as a Cartesian oval. The Visby lenses found in Viking treasures on the island of Gotland dating from the 11th or 12th century are also aspheric, but exhibit a wide variety of image qualities, ranging from similar to modern aspherics in one case to worse than spheric lenses in others. The origin of the lenses is unknown, as is their purpose (they may have been made as jewelry rather than for imaging).

Francis Smethwick ground the first high-quality aspheric lenses and presented them to the Royal Society on February 27, 1667/8. A telescope containing three aspheric elements was judged by those present "to exceed [a common, but very good telescope] in goodness, by taking in a greater Angle and representing the Objects more exactly in their respective proportions, and enduring a greater Aperture, free from Colours." Aspheric reading and burning glasses also outdid their spherical equivalents.

Moritz von Rohr is usually credited with the design of the first aspheric lenses for eyeglasses. He invented the eyeglass lens designs that became the Zeiss Punktal lenses.

The world's first commercial, mass-produced aspheric lens element was manufactured by Elgeet for use in the Golden Navitar 12 mm f/1.2 normal lens for use on 16 mm movie cameras in 1956. This lens received a great deal of industry acclaim during its day. The aspheric elements were created by the use of a membrane polishing technique.

== Testing of aspheric lens systems ==
The optical quality of a lens system can be tested in an optics or physics laboratory using bench apertures, optic tubes, lenses, and a source. Refractive and reflective optical properties can be tabulated as a function of wavelength, to approximate system performances; tolerances and errors can also be evaluated. In addition to focal integrity, aspheric lens systems can be tested for aberrations before being deployed.

The use of interferometers has become a standard method of testing optical surfaces. Typical interferometer testing is done for flat and spherical optical elements. The use of a null corrector in the test can remove the aspheric component of the surface and allow testing using a flat or spherical reference.

== In nature ==
Trilobites, one of the earliest types of animal with sophisticated eyes, had lenses with two aspheric elements.

== See also ==
- Hyperbola
- Parabola
- Precision glass moulding
- Radius of curvature (optics)
