= Mercedes Vila =

Spanish researcher and physicist

- Mercedes Vila Juárez
- Born: 1975 (age 50–51); Madrid, Spain
- Education: Autonomous University of Madrid
- Known for: Material science
- Awards: L'Oréal-UNESCO For Women in Science Awards
- Scientific career
- Workplaces: Complutense University of Madrid, University of Aveiro; S.L.-CTECHnano

Mercedes Vila Juárez (born 1975) is a Spanish material science researcher. She is the chief technology officer (CTO) and co-founder of BioTech Foods SL.

== Path ==
Mercedes Vila Juárez Vila was born in Madrid, Spain. graduated in Physics from the Autonomous University of Madrid with a doctorate in Materials Physics, in December 2003.

She did five years of international post-doctoral experience, funded by a Marie Curie Intra-European fellowship and several national programs of investigation, to develop biomaterials surfaces using physical and chemical methods.

In 2008, she incorporated as a Ramón y Cajal Investigator at the faculty of Pharmacy of the Complutense University of Madrid, in one of the most prestigious European groups of Nanomedice and regenerative Tissue engineering, with the funding of an ERG-Marie Curie Action grant (2008–2010). During this period, she developed materials for the reconstruction of the loss of bone mass, with what promised to improve the quality of life of patients with some injuries, and pathologies such as bone cancer or osteoporosis.

Her work has focused on understanding materials-cells interactions, and the design and applications of nanoparticles based on graphene oxide for cancer hyperthermia..

In November 2010, she was awarded, with four other scientists (Isabel Lastres Becker, Ana Briones Alonso, Elena Ramírez Parra and María Antonia Herrero), the L'Oréal-UNESCO Awards for Women in Science, with an endowment of €15000 to reward the work, for women younger than 40 years, to support woman in science.

In 2013, she was Principal Investigator at the University of Aveiro, becoming laboratory coordinator for applications of carbon in nanomedicine. In 2015, while keeping her appointment as professor at the University of Aveiro, she transferred to industry in 2015 as Scientific Director of Coating Technologies S.L.-CTECHnano,

She co-founded BioTech Foods in February 2017, being the CTO of the company.

== Awards ==
- 2006: Marie Curie IntraEuropean Fellowship. European Commission
- 2008: Marie Curie Reintegration Grant. European Commission
- 2010: Women in Science Award. L'Oreal Foundation-UNESCO
- 2017: Marie Curie Society & Enterprise. European Commission

== See also ==
- List of female scientists in the 21st century
- List of Spanish inventors and discoverers
