= Elena Barraquer Compte =

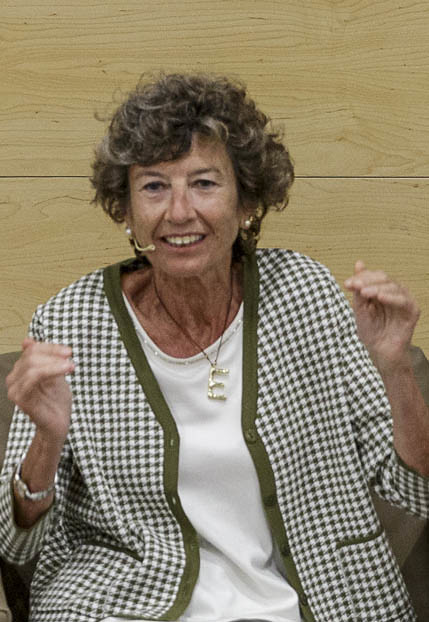
- Born: May 30, 1954 (age 72); Barcelona
- Occupation: Eye surgeon
- Known for: Eye surgery in Africa
- Children: 2
- Parent: Joaquín Barraquer

Elena Barraquer Compte (born May 30, 1954) is a Spanish ophthalmologist specializing in cataract surgery and corneal transplantation. She is the founder of the Elena Barraquer Fundación. She organises cataract fixing trips to Africa by her surgeons and teams. In 2012 she was recognized with the Medal of Honor of Barcelona and in 2018 she was recognized with the Queen Sophia Spanish Institute award in her category of Excellence Awards.

== Life ==
Compte was born in Barcelona in 1954 into a family known for medical research. She was part of the fourth generation of ophthalmologists and her brother was expected to follow in the family business. Elena decided that she too wanted to become an eye surgeon even though it was not expected. Her father is Professor Joaquín Barraquer and she is the granddaughter of Ignacio Barraquer known for their advances in cataract surgery and great-granddaughter of José Antonio Barraquer Roviralta, founder in 1903 of the Ophthalmological Society of Barcelona and the first professor of ophthalmology in Spain in 1914. Compte's brother Rafael Ignacio Barraquer Compte also dedicates himself to eye surgery.

Comte graduated in surgery from the Autonomous University of Barcelona in 1977. She completed her internship at the Vall Hebron University Hospital in Barcelona where in 1978 she obtained a scholarship to specialize in the National Eye Institute belonging to the National Institutes of Health of Bethesda, Maryland. There she made her first surgical trip visiting Port au Prince in Haiti. For two years she was working on the investigation of retinal pigment epithelium cultures and their application in various pathologies. She subsequently joined as a Fellow in eye pathology at the Wilmer Eye Institute of the Johns Hopkins Medical Institutions in Baltimore. There he was working in the laboratory of Professor W. Richard Green from 1980 to 1983.

She had been involved in making up to twelve trips per year to Africa. Her brother who was the director wanted to redirect the family's charitable foundation towards education, research and training. Elena felt that this was the course that her father would have backed. She was no longer able to continue the many trips to Africa, but her foundation attracted young doctors who were keen to continue the work. A visit to Cape Verde involved hundreds of operations and about 500 kg of materials, but the benefit has been estimated to be $20m because the operation not only returns an adult to work but may also release a child carer who can now return to school.

Elena and her brother are still co-owners of The Barraquer Clinic.

== Awards and recognition ==
- 2012 Medal of Honor of the City of Barcelona
- 2017 Codespa Award in Solidarity SME category
- 2018 Queen Sophia Spanish Institute award.
