= Isabel Lastres Becker =

Spanish biochemist (born 1974)

- Born: 1974 (age 51–52)
- Citizenship: Spain; Germany
- Education: Complutense University of Madrid
- Known for: Biochemistry
- Awards: L'Oréal-UNESCO Awards for Women in Science
- Scientific career
- Workplaces: Autonomous University of Madrid

Isabel Ballasts Becker (born 1974) is a German-Spanish scientist and chemist on the faculty of biochemistry in the medical department at the Autonomous University of Madrid.

== Life ==
She graduated in chemical sciences, specialising in biochemistry from the Complutense University of Madrid. Her work centres on the molecular basis of several neurodegenerative illnesses, like Huntington's disease and Parkinson's disease. In her project, she studies the cause of neuron death in Parkinson's, and experiments with drugs to delay the advance of the illness.

== Awards ==
Her work as a researcher has been recognised by the scientific community and she has received prizes like the Scientific Achievement Award or the Extraordinary Prize of Doctorate in the Universidad Complutense of Madrid.

In November 2010, she was awarded, with four scientists (María Antonia Herrero, Ana Briones Alonso, Mercedes Vila and Elena Ramírez Parra), the L'Oréal-UNESCO Awards for Women in Science, with an endowment of €15,000 to reward the work of women younger than 40 years.

== See also ==
- List of female scientists in the 21st century
- List of Spanish inventors and discoverers
