= BioTech Foods =

Spanish food technology company

- Company type: Subsidiary
- Industry: Food technology
- Founded: 2017; 9 years ago
- Founders: Mercedes Vila and Iñigo Charola
- Headquarters: San Sebastián, Spain
- Parent: JBS S.A.
- Website: biotech-foods.com

BioTech Foods is a Spanish biotechnology company dedicated to the development of cultured meat from the cultivation of muscle cells previously extracted from animals. It is a subsidiary of Brazilian company JBS S.A.

== History ==
=== Origins ===
The company is based in Donostia–San Sebastián, Basque Country and was co-founded in 2017 by the CTO of the project, Mercedes Vila, and CEO Iñigo Charola.

This project is based on the construction of tissues from the natural proliferation of animal cells in a controlled environment of humidity and temperature, without genetic modification or antibiotics. Cultured meat based on tissue engineering aims to help alleviate three serious sustainability problems: the high increase in global demand for animal proteins, the environmental impact of factory farming, associated with the production of greenhouse gases and deforestation and animal welfare.

=== Development ===
The start-up obtained the support of the CIC Nanogune, a research centre promoted by the Basque government. In 2019 BioTech Foods received the Entrepreneur XXI Award and came first in Expansión's Start Up awards in the Food and Agrotech category.

By February 2020, BioTech Foods was in the development phase of Ethicameat, its brand of pig protein products for the general public and the meat sector. BioTech Foods was one of the first companies to emerge in the global cultured meat sector which could help increase food safety and prevent zoonotic diseases.

=== Pilot plant and JBS investment ===
As of July 2019, one of the main challenges of the cultivated meat was the high production costs of products. BioTech Foods stated it sought 'to reach pilot scale by 2021'. By the end of 2019, BioTech had opened its first pilot plant.

In November 2021, BioTech Foods announced an agreement by which JBS S.A. was going to acquire a majority of shares in the company, including the pilot plant it operated in San Sebastián. JBS was going to invest in the construction of a new production plant to help BioTech achieve commercial production capacity in mid-2024.
