= Optical manufacturing and testing =

Optical manufacturing and testing is the process of manufacturing and testing optical components. It spans a wide range of manufacturing procedures and optical test configurations.

The manufacture of a conventional spherical lens typically begins with the generation of the optic's rough shape by grinding a glass blank. This can be done, for example, with ring tools. Next, the lens surface is polished to its final form. Typically this is done by lapping—rotating and rubbing the rough lens surface against a tool with the desired surface shape, with a mixture of abrasives and fluid in between. Typically a carved pitch tool is used to polish the surface of a lens. The mixture of abrasive is called slurry and it is typically made from cerium or zirconium oxide in water with lubricants added to facilitate pitch tool movement without sticking to the lens. The particle size in the slurry is adjusted to get the desired shape and finish.

Types of lapping include planetary lapping, double-sided lapping, and cylindrical lapping.

During polishing, the lens may be tested to confirm that the desired shape is being produced, and to ensure that the final shape has the correct form to within the allowed precision. The deviation of an optical surface from the correct shape is typically expressed in fractions of a wavelength, for some convenient wavelength of light (perhaps the wavelength at which the lens is to be used, or a visible wavelength for which a source is available). Inexpensive lenses may have deviations of form as large as several wavelengths (λ, 2λ, etc.). More typical industrial lenses would have deviations no larger than a quarter wavelength (λ/4). Precision lenses for use in applications such as lasers, interferometers, and holography have surfaces with a tenth of a wavelength (λ/10) tolerance or better. In addition to surface profile, a lens must meet requirements for surface quality (scratches, pits, specks, etc.) and accuracy of dimensions.

== Fabrication techniques ==
- Glass blank manufacturing
  - Batch mixing
  - Casting techniques
  - Annealing schedules and equipment
  - Physical characterization techniques
  - Index of refraction measurements and calculation of melt pedigree
- Diamond shaping techniques
  - Diamond wheel curve generation processes and equipment
  - Diamond edging processes and equipment
- Loose grit fabrication techniques:
  - Rough grinding
  - Fine grinding
  - Polishing and figuring
- Glass moulding techniques
  - Precision glass moulding

Unconventional techniques include single-point diamond turning (SPDT) and magnetorheological finishing (MRF).

=== Free-abrasive grinding ===
Free-abrasive grinding is a technique to grind down the surface of a material before polishing. It involves the use of small particles of grit to grind away small chips of material from the surface of an optical workpiece. The grit particles are known as free abrasives. The particles are added to a liquid slurry, which goes between a grinding plate and the material. Sliding motions between the grinding plate and the material are used.

After grinding, there is a small amount of surface roughness, which is based on the size of the grit. There is also a small amount of fracturing below the surface of the material, known as subsurface damage (SSD).

To reduce the amount of surface roughness and subsurface damage, additional grinding at a smaller grit size can be done. Typically, two or three stages of grinding are used, with the second and third stages having a size that is decreasing. For example, a typical set of grit stages is 30 micrometer, then 15 micrometer, then 9 micrometer. An alternate set of typical grit stages is 20 micrometer, then 12 micrometer, then 5 micrometer.

Types of abrasives include aluminium oxide, industrial diamond, and silicon carbide. Diamond is typically only used for grinding down very hard materials, or for certain crystals.

=== Polishing ===
Optics are polished in a slurry of abrasive particles, a fluid carrier, and optional additives. Types of abrasive particles that can be used include cerium(IV) oxide, diamond, aluminum oxide, and colloidal silica. Optional additives include suspension agents, lubricants, and detergents.

== Materials ==
There are various materials that can be used for optical components, including various types of glass, fused silica, silicon, and crystal quartz. Calcium fluoride (CaF_{2}) can be used as an optical material, although it is easily fractured and scratched.

Materials for infrared optical components include zinc selenide (ZnSe), zinc sulfide (ZnS), and gallium arsenide (GaAs).

== Specifications ==
The specifications for optical components vary based on their type:

Specifications for prisms include pyramidal error, beam path, beam displacement and deviation, base angle, roof edge chips, wavefront, and polarization.

Specifications for aspheric lenses include base radius with tolerance, conic and polynomial coefficients, best-fit sphere reference, sag table reference, sag error tolerance, slope errors versus bandwidth, wavefront per specified test, tilt, and decenter.

Optical coating specifications include apertures, reflection, transmission, absorption, phase shift, adhesion, abrasion resistance, and damage threshold.

In order to avoid the irrecoverable loss of going under minimum thickness, opticians strive to meet all other specifications for an optical component at the maximum allowable thickness within tolerance.

=== Surface quality ===
Surface quality is the condition of the surface of an optical component. It indicates the presence of imperfections, such as scratches and pits. It is typically rated according to scratch-dig (S-D) specifications.

Standards for specifying surface quality include the U.S. Military Performance Specification MIL-PRF-13830B and ISO 10110. MIL-PRF-13830B was formerly MIL-O-13830a. Other standards include MIL-C-48497a and MIL-F-48616, which are formally inactive and apply only to coatings. All three of these military standards lack specifications for statistical surface parameters, such as root-mean-square roughness, slope error, and ripple. An extension and improvement to MIL-PRF is the ANSI/OEOSC OP1.002 standard.

== Testing techniques ==
- Direct surface profile measurement
- Direct surface surveying (no intervening optics, for example Foucault knife-edge test, Ronchi test, Caustic test)
- Auxiliary optics (null correctors, computer-generated holograms, etc.)
- Interferometric testing

The Fizeau interferometer is the standard type of interferometer that is used in optical fabrication.

Stitching interferometry can be used for testing aspheres. It involves performing subaperture tests that are stitched together into a single-high resolution image.

== See also ==
- Optical lens design
- Vapor polishing

== Notes and references ==
- Malacara, D., Optical Shop Testing - 2nd Edition, John Wiley and Sons, 1992, ISBN 0-471-52232-5
