= Cryolathe =

Nigeria rapper, singer and songwriter

A cryolathe is a device used for freezing and grinding human corneal tissue into different refractive powers.

== See also ==
- Epikeratophakia
- Keratomileusis
- Refractive surgery
