= Diamond turning =

Method for making advanced optical elements

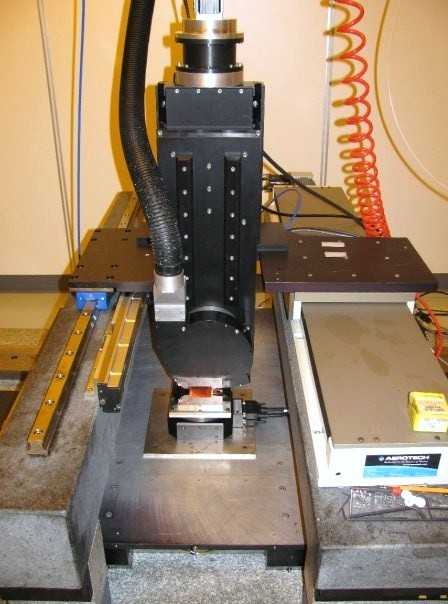
Diamond flycutting

Diamond turning is turning using a cutting tool with a diamond tip. It is a process of mechanical machining of precision elements using lathes or derivative machine tools (e.g., turn-mills, rotary transfers) equipped with natural or synthetic diamond-tipped tool bits. The term single-point diamond turning (SPDT) is sometimes applied, although as with other lathe work, the "single-point" label is sometimes only nominal (radiused tool noses and contoured form tools being options). The process of diamond turning is widely used to manufacture high-quality aspheric optical elements from crystals, metals, acrylic, and other materials. Plastic optics are frequently molded using diamond turned mold inserts. Optical elements produced by the means of diamond turning are used in optical assemblies in telescopes, video projectors, missile guidance systems, lasers, scientific research instruments, and numerous other systems and devices. Most SPDT today is done with computer numerical control (CNC) machine tools. Diamonds also serve in other machining processes, such as milling, grinding, and honing. Diamond turned surfaces have a high specular brightness and require no additional polishing or buffing, unlike other conventionally machined surfaces.

== Process ==
Diamond turning is a multi-stage process. Initial stages of machining are carried out using a series of CNC lathes of increasing accuracy. A diamond-tipped lathe tool is used in the final stages of the manufacturing process to achieve sub-nanometer level surface finishes and sub-micrometer form accuracies. The surface finish quality is measured as the peak-to-valley distance of the grooves left by the lathe. The form accuracy is measured as a mean deviation from the ideal target form. Quality of surface finish and form accuracy is monitored throughout the manufacturing process using such equipment as contact and laser profilometers, laser interferometers, optical and electron microscopes. Diamond turning is most often used for making infrared optics, because at longer wavelengths midspatial frequencies do not affect optical performance as it is less sensitive to surface finish quality, and because many of the materials used are difficult to polish with traditional methods.

Temperature control is crucial, because the surface must be accurate on distance scales shorter than the wavelength of light. Temperature changes of a few degrees during machining can alter the form of the surface enough to have an effect. The main spindle may be cooled with a liquid coolant to prevent temperature deviations.

The diamonds that are used in the process are strong in the downhill regime but tool wear is also highly dependent on crystal anisotropy and work material.

=== The machine tool ===
For best possible quality natural diamonds are used as single-point cutting elements during the final stages of the machining process. A CNC SPDT lathe rests atop a high-quality granite base with micrometer surface finish quality. The granite base is placed on air suspension on a solid foundation, keeping its working surface strictly horizontal. The machine tool components are placed on top of the granite base and can be moved with high degree of accuracy using a high-pressure air cushion or hydraulic suspension. The machined element is attached to an air chuck using negative air pressure and is usually centered manually using a micrometer. The chuck itself is separated from the electric motor that spins it by another air suspension.

The cutting tool is moved with sub-micron precision by a combination of electric motors and piezoelectric actuators. As with other CNC machines, the motion of the tool is controlled by a list of coordinates generated by a computer. Typically, the part to be created is first described using a computer aided design (CAD) model, then converted to G-code using a computer aided manufacturing (CAM) program, and the G-code is then executed by the machine control computer to move the cutting tool. The final surface is achieved with a series of cutting passes to maintain a ductile cutting regime.

Alternative methods of diamond machining in practice also include diamond fly cutting and diamond milling. Diamond fly cutting can be used to generate diffraction gratings and other linear patterns with appropriately contoured diamond shapes. Diamond milling can be used to generate aspheric lens arrays by annulus cutting methods with a spherical diamond tool.

== Materials ==
Diamond turning is specifically useful when cutting materials that are viable as infrared optical components and certain non-linear optical components such as potassium dihydrogen phosphate (KDP). KDP is a perfect material in application for diamond turning, because the material is very desirable for its optical modulating properties, yet it is impossible to make optics from this material using conventional methods. KDP is water-soluble, so conventional grinding and polishing techniques are not effective in producing optics. Diamond turning works well to produce optics from KDP.

Generally, diamond turning is restricted to certain materials. Materials that are readily machinable include:

- Plastics
  - Acetal
  - Acrylic
  - Nylon
  - Polycarbonate
  - Polypropylene
  - Polystyrene
  - Zeonex
- Metals
  - Aluminum and aluminium alloys
  - Brass
  - Copper
  - Gold
  - Nickel-phosphorus alloy, deposited via electrolytic or electroless nickel plating on other materials
  - Silver
  - Tin
  - Zinc
- Infrared crystals
  - Cadmium sulfide
  - Cadmium telluride
  - Calcium fluoride
  - Cesium iodide
  - Gallium arsenide
  - Germanium
  - Lithium niobate
  - Potassium bromide
  - Potassium dihydrogen phosphate (KDP)
  - Silicon
  - Sodium chloride
  - Tellurium dioxide
  - Zinc selenide
  - Zinc sulfide

The most often requested materials that are not readily machinable are:

- Silicon-based glasses and ceramics
- Ferrous materials (steel, iron)
- Beryllium
- Titanium
- Molybdenum
- Nickel (except for electroless nickel plating)

Ferrous materials are not readily machinable because the carbon in the diamond tool chemically reacts with the substrate, leading to tool damage and dulling after short cut lengths. Several techniques have been investigated to prevent this reaction, but few have been successful for long diamond machining processes at mass production scales.

Tool life improvement has been under consideration in diamond turning as the tool is expensive. Hybrid processes such as laser-assisted machining have emerged in this industry recently. The laser softens hard and difficult-to-machine materials such as ceramics and semiconductors, making them easier to cut.

== Quality control ==
Despite all the automation involved in the diamond turning process, the human operator still plays the main role in achieving the final result. Quality control is a major part of the diamond turning process and is required after each stage of machining, sometimes after each pass of the cutting tool. If it is not detected immediately, even a minute error during any of the cutting stages results in a defective part. The extremely high requirements for quality of diamond-turned optics leave virtually no room for error.

The SPDT manufacturing process produces a relatively high percentage of defective parts, which must be discarded. As a result, the manufacturing costs are high compared to conventional polishing methods. Even with the relatively high volume of optical components manufactured using the SPDT process, this process cannot be classified as mass production, especially when compared with production of polished optics. Each diamond-turned optical element is manufactured on an individual basis with extensive manual labor.

== History ==
Research into single-point diamond turning began in the late 1940s with Philips in the Netherlands, while Lawrence Livermore National Laboratory (LLNL) pioneered SPDT in the mid-1960s. By 1979, LLNL received funding to transfer this technology to private industry.

LLNL initially focused on two-axis machining for axisymmetric surfaces and developed the Large Optics Diamond Turning Machine (LDTM), a highly accurate lathe. They also experimented with freeform surfaces using fast tool servos and XZC (slow tool servo) turning, leading to applications like wavefront correctors for lasers.

Three-axis turning became more common in the early 1990s as diamond quality improved. Companies like Zeiss began producing refractive lenses for infrared optics, advancing freeform optical manufacturing. By 2002, interest in freeform shapes had expanded, especially in focusing lenses. Early applications included Polaroid’s SX-70 camera, and fast tool servos enabled rapid production of non-axisymmetric surfaces for contact lenses.

== See also ==
- Fabrication and testing (optical components)
