= José Antonio de Artigas Sanz =

Spanish engineer

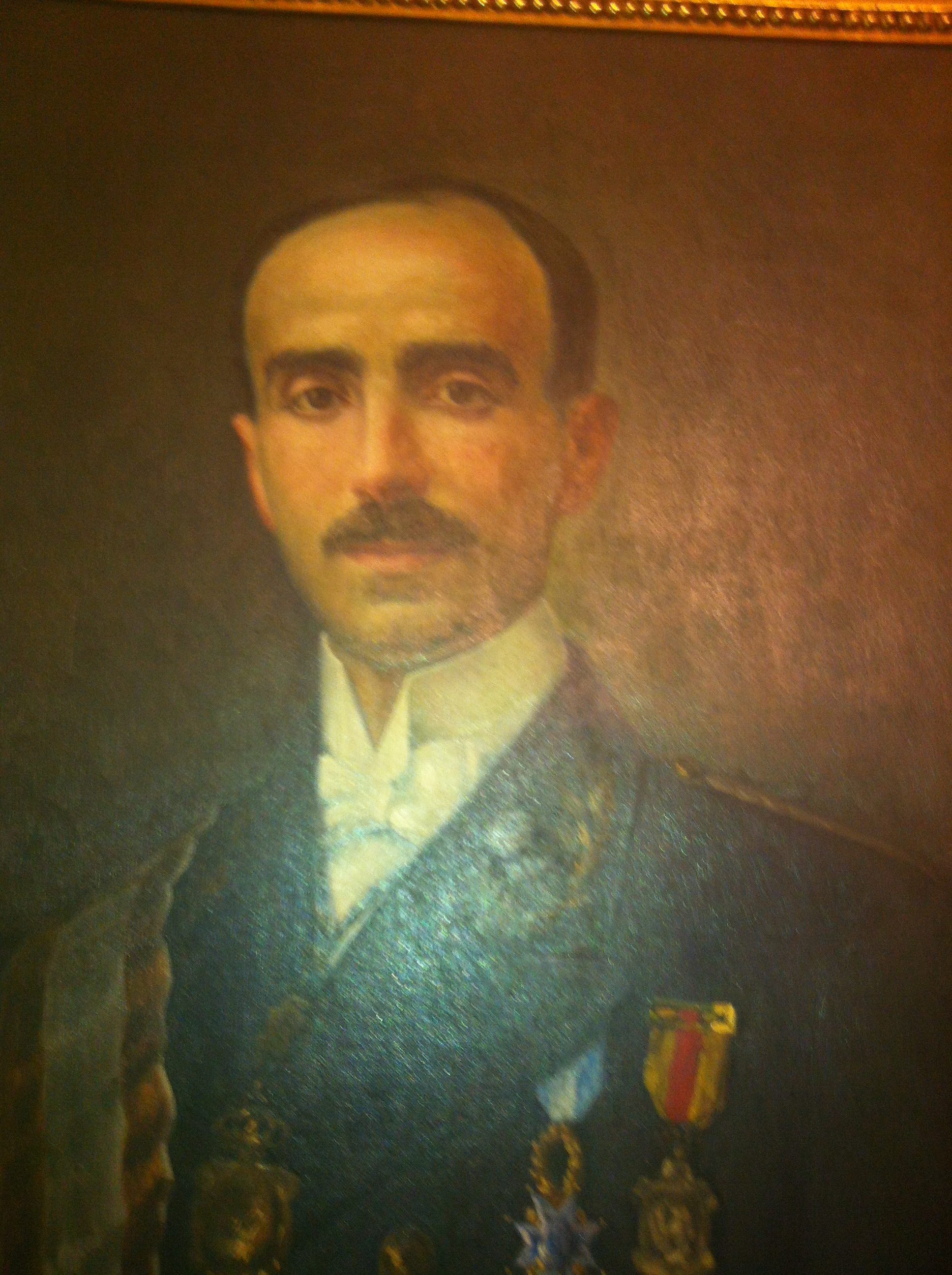
- Born: June 14, 1887; Zaragoza, Spain
- Died: March 4, 1977 (aged 89); Madrid, Spain

José Antonio de Artigas Sanz (June 14, 1887 – March 4, 1977) was a Spanish engineer who contributed to the standardization of terminology in the field of electrical engineering.

== Achievements ==
He earned his doctorate in engineering in 1907, and became a member of the Royal Spanish Academy of Exact, Physical and Natural Sciences. Even before graduating, he had used noble gases to create luminescence for the first time and set up a system that improved the performance of incandescent lighting. When the Spanish Permanent Commission for Electricity was set up in 1912 to represent Spain at the International Electrotechnical Commission (IEC), De Artigas was appointed President of the Spanish Electrotechnical Committee, a post he held for the remainder of his life. At this period, an IEC Technical Committee had already started work on nomenclature, and De Artigas made an important contribution to the preparation of the first edition of the "International Electrotechnical Vocabulary", which contained 2,000 terms divided into 14 groups, and was completed in 1938. In 1952, the Spanish branch of the committee, under his direction, prepared the Spanish-language version of the Vocabulary, as well as a special version intended for institutes of higher learning in Latin America, containing definitions in Spanish with translations into French, English, German and Italian. He was appointed Honorary President of the IEC at the council meeting held in Madrid in 1959. His work with various international organizations secured unanimous consent to give the scientific unit of light intensity a Spanish name: candela. In addition to his work in electronics, he helped to establish the Spanish precision glass industry and, in North America, succeeded in casting a twenty-three ton glass block completely free of imperfections for the Palomar Mountain telescope.

== Personal life ==
José Antonio de Artigas Sanz was born on June 14, 1887, in Zaragoza and died on March 4, 1977, in Madrid.

== Resumé ==
=== Offices ===
- Professor of the Higher Institute of Technology for Industrial Engineering.
- Counsellor to the Ministry of Education, the Council of Scientific Research and the International Institute of Statistics.
- Director of the Institute of Industrial Studies and Research, an institute that was later renamed in his honor.
- President of the Council of Industry.
- President of the Institute of Civil Engineers.
- First President of the Technical Section of the Permanent Commission of Weights and Measures.
- Honorary Director of the Spanish National Institute of Medicine and Industrial Safety.
- Counsellor of the National Economic Council.
- President of the National Federation of the National Council of Fuel and Chemical Companies.
- Vice President of the Spanish National Optical Company.
- Director of the research center of the International Glass Commission.
- Honorary Member of the Society of Glass Technology, and the German Association for Glass Technology.
- Fellow of the American Institute of Electrical Engineers.

=== Honors ===
- Grand Cross of the Order of Isabella the Catholic.
- Gentleman in Waiting to His Majesty King Alfonso XIII.
- Doctor Honoris Causa of the University of Paris.
