= Epikeratophakia =

Refractive surgical procedure

- ICD-9-CM: 11.76
- MeSH: D017391

Epikeratophakia (also known as epikeratoplasty and onlay lamellar keratoplasty) is a refractive surgical procedure in which a lamella of a donor cornea is transplanted onto the anterior surface of the patient's cornea. A lamellar disc from a donor cornea is placed over the de-epithelialized host cornea and sutured into a prepared groove on the host cornea. Indications include treatment of keratoconus, refractive errors like myopia and high hypermetropia including aphakia, which cannot be corrected with conservative methods.

== Complications ==
Common complications of epikeratophakia include delayed post operative visual recovery, reduced best corrected visual acuity, prolonged epithelial defects and irregular astigmatism.

== History ==
In 1949, José Barraquer introduced refractive procedure of inclusion of a lenticule within the corneal stromal layer. In 1980s, based on Barraquer's procedure, Werblin, Kaufman and Klyce at the LSU Eye Center introduced epikeratophakia.
