= Precision glass moulding =

Production of optical glass without grinding and polishing

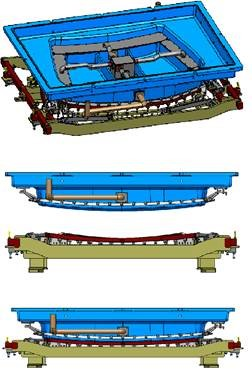
Glass press production mould tool

Precision glass moulding is a replicative process that allows the production of high precision optical components from glass without grinding and polishing. The process is also known as ultra-precision glass pressing. It is used to manufacture precision glass lenses for consumer products such as digital cameras, and high-end products like medical systems. The main advantage over mechanical lens production is that complex lens geometries such as aspheres can be produced cost-efficiently.

== Process ==
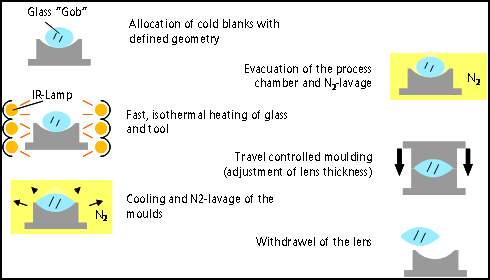
Summary of process

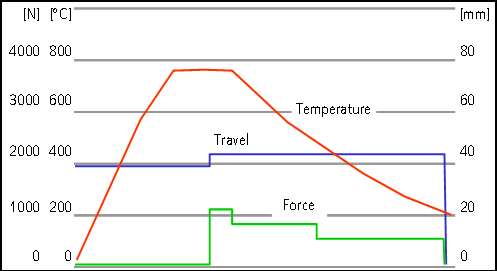
Temperature (in °C), travel (in mm), and force (in N) during the process.

The precision glass moulding process consists of six steps:

1. The glass blank is loaded into the lower side of the moulding tool.
2. Oxygen is removed from the working area by filling with nitrogen and/or evacuation of the process chamber.
3. The tool system is nearly closed (no contact of the upper mould) and the entire system of mould, die and glass is heated up. Infrared lamps are used for heating in most systems.
4. After reaching the working temperature, which is between the transition temperature and the softening point of the glass, the moulds close further and start pressing the glass in a travel-controlled process.
5. When the final thickness of the part has been achieved, the pressing switches over to a force-controlled process.
6. After moulding has been completed, the glass is cooled down and the working environment is filled with nitrogen. When the lens has cooled to the point where it can be handled, it is removed from the tool.

The process is executed on a specialized moulding machine, which precisely controls the temperature, travel, and force during the process. The tools used must withstand high temperatures and pressures, and need to be resistant to chemical interaction with the glass. The mold materials also have to be suitable for machining into the precise surface profiles.

== Process chain ==
In order to ensure the desired quality the parts are measured between each process step. Additionally, the parts are handled and transported carefully between the processing and metrology steps.

1. Hotforming of gobs: The precision glass moulding process yields the best results in both quality and cost if it works with precise preforms. These are usually acquired by pressing or hotforming of "gobs" of molten glass. This step is done by continuous glass melting and moulding in single-sided metal moulds. This process is only suitable for high production volumes. For smaller production volumes, the preforms have to be manufactured by mechanical material-removing steps from blocks or slices of raw glass.
2. Precision glass moulding: In this step the preform is directly formed into an optical glass lens. It is necessary to clean the glass preform and the mould before starting the process, but there is no polishing or post-machining required.
3. Lens coating: An antireflection coating is applied to the finished lenses. The lenses are first cleaned, and then loaded into a fixture. The fixture, containing a large number of lenses, is placed in the coating machine. After finishing the process the glass lenses are removed from the holder and the holder is cleaned by sand-blasting or other techniques. Usually the optical coating is done by one of two methods: physical vapour deposition (PVD), in which oxide materials evaporate and are deposited on the lens, and plasma-enhanced chemical vapor deposition (PECVD). Chemical reactions take place in a vacuum and the reaction product is deposited on the lens. The lenses are coated for two reasons:
  1. Manipulate or improve the optical transmission / reflection
  2. Enhance the mechanical, chemical or electrical properties

== Tool and mould design ==
=== Lens shapes ===
==== Shape of optical element ====
Precision glass moulding can be used to produce a large variety of optical form elements such as spheres, aspheres, free-form elements and array-structures.

Concerning the curvature of the lens elements, the following statements can be drawn: Acceptable lens shapes are most bi-convex, plano-convex and mild meniscus shapes. Not unacceptable but hard to mould are bi-concave lenses, steep meniscus lenses, and lenses with severe features (e.g. a bump on a convex surface). In general, plano-curved lenses are easier to mould than lenses with both sides curved since matching of flat faces is easier. Moulding concave forms with small centre thickness is difficult due to sticking of the moulded part to the mould occurring as a result of the different thermal expansion coefficients. Furthermore, it is recommended to avoid undercuts and sharp edges. For the lens design it should be considered that the lens has to be mountable in measurement systems.

==== Shape of preforms ====
The shape of the preform or "blank" needs to be chosen according to the geometry of the finished optical element. Possible preforms are spherical (ball), near spherical (gob), plano-plano, plano-convex, plano-concave, biconvex and biconcave blanks. Ball and gob-blanks do not have to be premachined whereas other preforms require grinding and polishing.

The following section describes basic traits of preform choice:

- Formed Ball Preform

“Used specifically for lenses with positive power: biconvex, plano-convex, and meniscus where the convex side is stronger than the concave side, this only works for a relatively small volume of material.”

- Ground and Polished Plano-Plano Preform

“As a lens changes to negative in power biconcave, plano-concave, and meniscus where the concave side is stronger, an alternative preform shape, plano-plano, is required for the molding process. […] Relative to a formed preform an increase in cost is observed for the manufacturing of this type of preform.”

- Ground and Polished Ball Preform

“When the geometry of a lens extends beyond the volume range of a formed ball preform, a ground and polished ball preform is required. Used for lenses with positive power: biconvex, plano-convex, and meniscus: where the convex side is stronger, this geometry allows for molding of lenses with larger total volume. […] Relative to a formed preform and a plano-plano preform, an increase in cost is observed for the manufacturing of this type of preform.”

- Ground and Polished Lenslet Preform

“The Lenslet preform is primarily for lenses with positive power, biconvex, planoconvex, and meniscus: where the convex side is the strongest surface. The use of this type of preform allows for molding of the largest volume of glass at any given time in the molding machines. The Lenslet is traditionally ground and polished to a near net shape of the final lens, and then pressed. [...] The cost associated with the manufacturing of the lenslet preform is the highest of all preform types.”

- Gob Preform

Precision gobs can be used as preforms for the production of aspherical lenses in a precision molding process. They are manufactured from a continuous glass melting process. The resulting precision gobs exhibit a very smooth firepolished surface with an excellent surface roughness and high volume accuracy.

=== Dimensions ===
The dimensions of the optical elements that can be moulded depend on the size of the moulding machine. The precision glass moulding process is not limited to small optics. For the right element geometry, it can enable economical production of aspheric lenses up to 60 mm in diameter and more than 20 mm thick.

General design recommendations:

Size:

- Diameter range: 0.5–70 mm depending on the application
- Flank angle: Sometimes <60 degree due to limited metrology but higher angles are possible by some manufacturers that have expanded metrology capabilities (e.g. Panasonic UA3P or similar).
- Edge thickness preferably > 1.0 mm, alternatively 0.5 to 2.0 x center thickness
- Clear aperture should be smaller than the lens diameter, preferably at least 1.0 mm (per side) less
- Optical surfaces:

Radius:

- Base radius no less than 3.0 mm

Optical Surfaces:

- Sags no greater than 8 mm on both concave and convex surfaces
- Transition from the optical surface to the lens outside diameter requires a minimum radius value of 0.3 mm.

Volume:

- Volume of the lens (including flanges), V <= 4/3 π r^{3}, where r is the smallest local convex radius.

=== Tolerances ===
Although the form, dimensional and positional tolerances that can be achieved in precision glass moulding are subject to a natural border, the values being achieved in practice strongly depend on the degree of control and experience in mould making and moulding. The table below gives an overview of achievable manufacturing tolerances in precision glass moulding at different companies.

Parameter	Rochester Precision Optics	Braunecker	Lightpath Technologies	Ingeneric	FISBA
Diameter	+0/-0.010 mm		+/-0.005 mm	0,005 mm	+/- 0.005 mm
Center thickness	+/-0,012 mm		+/- 0.010 mm	0,010 mm	+/- 0.01 mm
Alignment	2,5 min (axis)	< 1.5min (angular)	5 μm	-	5 μm
Scratch-Dig	20-10		20-10/10-5	-	20-10
Abbe-Number	+/-0.5%		+/-1%	1%	-
Surface Roughness	-	<3 nm	<3 nm	5 nm	4 nm
Index of Refraction	+/-0.0003		+/-0.001	0,001	-
Wedge	0.01mm		+/-1 arcmin	1 arcmin	3'
RMS WFE			Diffraction Limited		

For aspherical lenses, the design should be able to tolerate 0.010 mm of lateral shear between surfaces plus 5 micrometres Total Internal Reflection of wedge (across the part without considering the lateral shear) to be considered robust.

Specifications for aspheres:

- Surface roughness (Ra): < 3 μm depending on diameter
- Form error (PV): < 1 μm depending on diameter

=== Index drop ===
Due to the fast cooling after moulding, the part retains a small amount of residual stress. Consequently, the glass exhibits a small change in the refractive index which has to be considered in the optical design. A higher cooling rate corresponds to a larger decrease of the refractive index. A lower cooling rate could circumvent the index drop, but would be less cost-efficient

== Glass material ==
Many glasses can be used with PGM. However, there are some limitations:

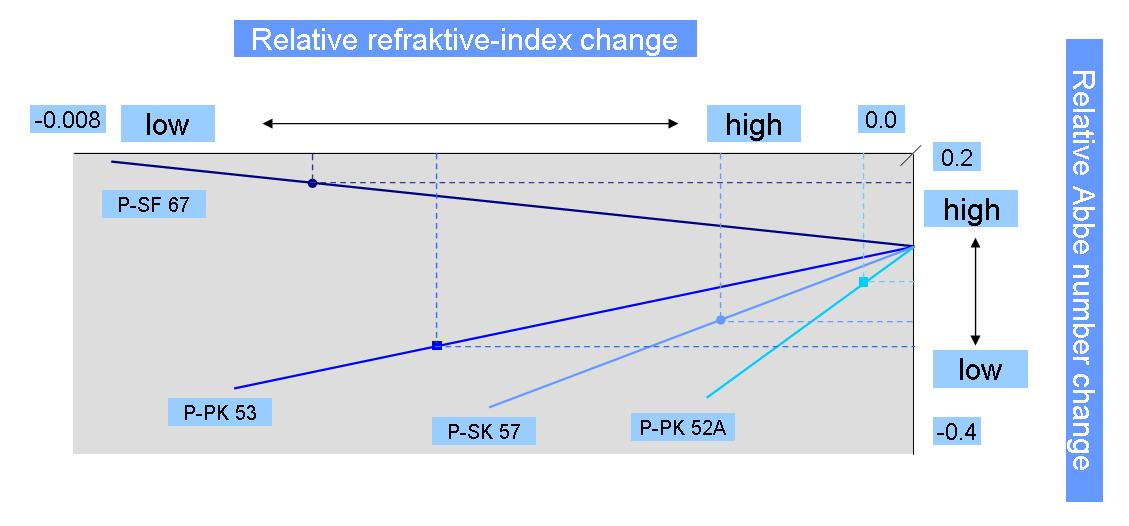
Change in refractive index and Abbe number for different glass types and annealing rates

- The glass transition temperature Tg must not exceed the maximum heating temperature of the mould
- Many lead oxide flint glasses are not compliant with the RoHS EU directive (Restriction of certain Hazardous Substances)
- The glass composition influences moulding tool life
- Chalcogenide materials require certain preform shapes
- Glass expansion/contraction is highly temperature and rate dependent phenomenon. The coefficient of thermal expansion (CTE) of mould and glass should match. High CTE difference means high deviation between the moulded glass and the mould. High CTE glasses are also critical in terms of non-uniform temperature distribution in the glass. This means that especially fast cooling can not be applied. In addition to this, the temperature difference between the warm lens directly after moulding and the surrounding air can easily cause cracks.
- In addition, temperature dependence of viscosity of glass, structural and stress viscoelastic relaxation of glass play an important role in determination of lens preform shape, final state of stress and shape deviation.
- The internal and external quality of the blank must be the same or better than the requirements of the finished lens since the precision glass moulding process is not able to improve the glass quality.
- The glass exhibits a change in refractive index, called index drop, during the annealing process. This drop is caused by fast cooling of the mould insert, inducing a small amount of residual stress in the glass. As a result, the glass exhibits a small index change when compared to its fine anneal state. The index drop is small (usually .002-.006), but the optical design needs to be optimized to compensate for this change. As an example, the index drop for different glass types is displayed in the picture on the right for different annealing rates. Note that the annealing rate is not necessarily constant during the cooling process. Typical “average” annealing rates for precision molding are between 1000 K/h and 10,000 K/h (or higher). Not only the refractive index, but also the Abbe-number of the glass is changed due to fast annealing. The shown points in the picture on the right indicate an annealing rate of 3500k/h.

So-called "low-Tg-glasses" with a maximum transition temperature of less than 550 °C have been developed in order to enable new manufacturing routes for the moulds. Mould materials such as steel can be used for moulding low-Tg-glasses whereas high-Tg–glasses require a high-temperature mould material, such as tungsten carbide.

== Substrate materials ==
The mould material must have sufficient strength, hardness and accuracy at high temperature and pressure. Good oxidation resistance, low thermal expansion and high thermal conductivity are also required. The material of the mould has to be suitable to withstand the process temperatures without undergoing deforming processes. Therefore, the mould material choice depends critically on the transition temperature of the glass material. For low-Tg-glasses, steel moulds with a nickel alloy coating can be used. Since they cannot withstand the high temperatures required for regular optical glasses, heat-resistant materials such as carbide alloys have to be used instead in this case. In addition, mould materials include aluminium alloys, glasslike or vitreous carbon, silicon carbide, silicon nitride and a mixture of silicon carbide and carbon.

A commonly used material in mould making is tungsten carbide. The mould inserts are produced by means of powder metallurgy, i.e. a sintering process followed by post-machining processes and sophisticated grinding operations. Most commonly a metallic binder (usually cobalt) is added in liquid phase sintering. In this process, the metallic binder improves the toughness of the mould as well as the sintering quality in the liquid phase to fully dense material. Moulds made of hard materials have a typical lifetime of thousands of parts (size dependent) and are cost-effective for volumes of 200-1000+ (depending upon the size of the part).

== Mould manufacturing ==
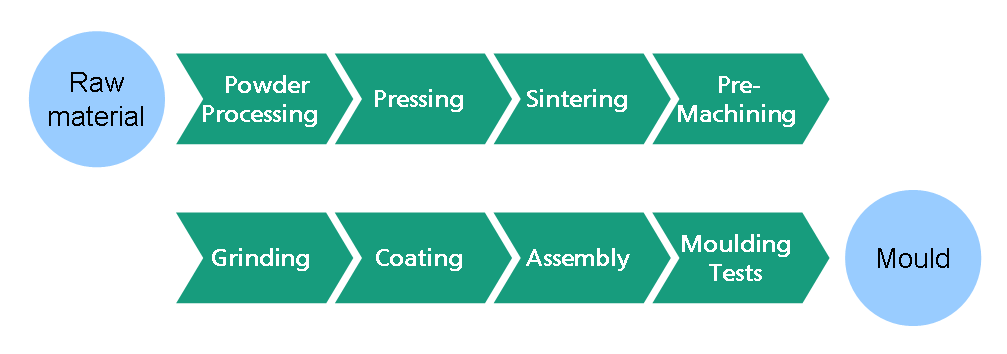
Process chain of mould making

This article describes how mould inserts are manufactured for precision glass moulding.

In order to ensure high quality standards metrology steps are implemented between each process step.

1. Powder processing: This process step is responsible for achieving grain sizes suitable for pressing and machining. The powder is processed by milling the raw material.
2. Pressing: This step does the pre-forming of "green" raw bodies of the mould inserts.
3. Sintering: By sintering, the pre-formed green bodies are compressed and hardened. In order to do this the green body is heated to a temperature below the melting temperature. The sintering process consists of three phases: First, the volume and the porosity is reduced and secondly, the open porosity is reduced. In the third phase, sinter necks are formed which enhance the material's strength.
4. Pre-Machining: The step of Pre-Machining creates the main form of the optical insert. It typically contains four process steps. These steps are grinding the inner/outer diameter, grinding the parallel/end faces of the insert, grinding/lapping of the fitting of insert, and finally, the near-net-shape grinding of the cavity. Normally, the cavity is only pre-machined to a flat or a best-fit sphere.
5. Grinding: Grinding or finish-machining creates the final form and the surface finish of the cavity in the mould insert. Usually, the finish is carried out by grinding; a subsequent polishing step is optionally required. Finish grinding can require several changes of the grinding tool and several truing steps of the tool. Finish-machining of the mould is an iterative process: As long as the machined mould shows deviations from the nominal contour in the measurement step after grinding, it has to be reground. There is no well-defined border between pre-machining and fine grinding. Throughout the grinding process of the cavity, the grain size of the tool, the feed rate and the cutting depth are reduced whereas machining time increases. Convex surfaces are easier to manufacture. The necessary steps of workpiece preparation are the mould alignment and the mould referencing. Grinding tool alignment, grinding tool referencing and grinding tool truing also have to be done. After that polishing can be necessary to remove the anisotropic structure which remains after grinding. It can be performed manually or by a CNC-machine.
6. Coating: Coating is the process step in which a layer is applied on the cavity surface of the optical insert which protects the mould against wear, corrosion, friction, sticking of glass and chemical reactions with glass. For coating the surface of moulds by physical vapour deposition (PVD), metals are evaporated in combination with process-gas-based chemicals. On the tool surface, highly adherent thin coatings are synthesized. Materials for coatings on optical inserts are Platinum-based PVD (mostly iridium-alloyed, standard), diamond-like carbon (not yet commercially available), SiC (CVD) on SiC-ceramics (not yet commercially available, have to be post-machined) or TiAlN (not yet commercially available). To achieve a homogeneous layer thickness, the mould's position has to be changed during coating. To prepare the mould for the coating the surfaces have to be degreased, cleaned (under clean room or near-clean room conditions) and batched. Especially the cathode of the machine has to be cleaned. After this process the workpiece has to be debatched.
7. Assembly: In this process step the optical insert and the mould base are combined to the assembled mould. For one optical element two mould inserts are necessary which are assembled outside the machine. For the assembly height measurement and spacer adjustment are essential.
8. Moulding Tests: This step determines whether the mould creates the specified form and surface quality. If mould is not suitable, it has to be reground. It is part of an iterative loop. The assembly of the mould has to be put into the machine to start the try-out-moulding.

In order to save the quality and enable an early warning in case of any problems between every single step there has to be a step of measurement and referencing. Besides that the time for transport and handling has to be taken into account in the planning of the process.

== Metrology and quality assurance ==
Once process and tool have been developed, precision glass moulding has a great advantage over conventional production techniques. The majority of the lens quality characteristics are tool-bound. This means that lenses, which are pressed with the same tool and process, usually have only insignificantly small deviations. For example, an important characteristic of a lens is the form of the optical surface. In the case of aspherical lenses the measurement of optical surfaces is very difficult and connected to high efforts. Additionally, when working with tactile measurement systems there is always a risk that the optical surface might be scratched. For precision moulded lenses such measurements are only necessary for a small amount of sample lenses in order to qualify the tool. The series production can then be executed without further need for measurements. In this case, only the cleanliness of the optical surface has to be monitored. Another advantage is that the lens' center thickness can be estimated from the easily measurable edge thickness or by applying a contactless measurement system.

== Protective coatings ==
In order to enhance the mould insert's lifetime, protective coatings can be applied. “The materials that have been selected for the antistick coatings can be divided into 5 groups including: (1) single layer carbides, nitrides, oxides and borides such as TiN, BN, TiAlN, NiAlN, TiBC, TiBCN, NiCrSiB and Al_{2}O_{3}, (2) nitrides or carbides based gradient and multilayers, (3) nitrides based superlattice films, (4) amorphous carbon or diamond-like carbon and (5) precious metal based alloys”

Experiments carried out by Ma et al. yield the following results: “The higher the temperature, the smaller the wetting angle between glass gob and substrate could be observed. This indicates that severe interface chemical reaction occurred and resulted in the loss of transparency in glass appearance. The wetting experiment in nitrogen ambient improved the sticking situation. The combination of chemically stable substrates and coatings, such as Sapphire (substrate) / GaN (film) and Glass (substrate) / Al_{2}O_{3} (film) can achieve the best antistick propose. The precious metal films such as PtIr (Platinum, Iridium) coated on the ceramic substrates can effectively reduce the interface reaction between the glass and substrates.”

Although PtIr is used as a standard coating material, it has the disadvantage of being expensive. Therefore, research activities aim at substituting PtIr with cheaper materials.

== See also ==
- Fabrication and testing (optical components)
