= Gianello della Torre =

Italian clockmaker, engineer and mathematician

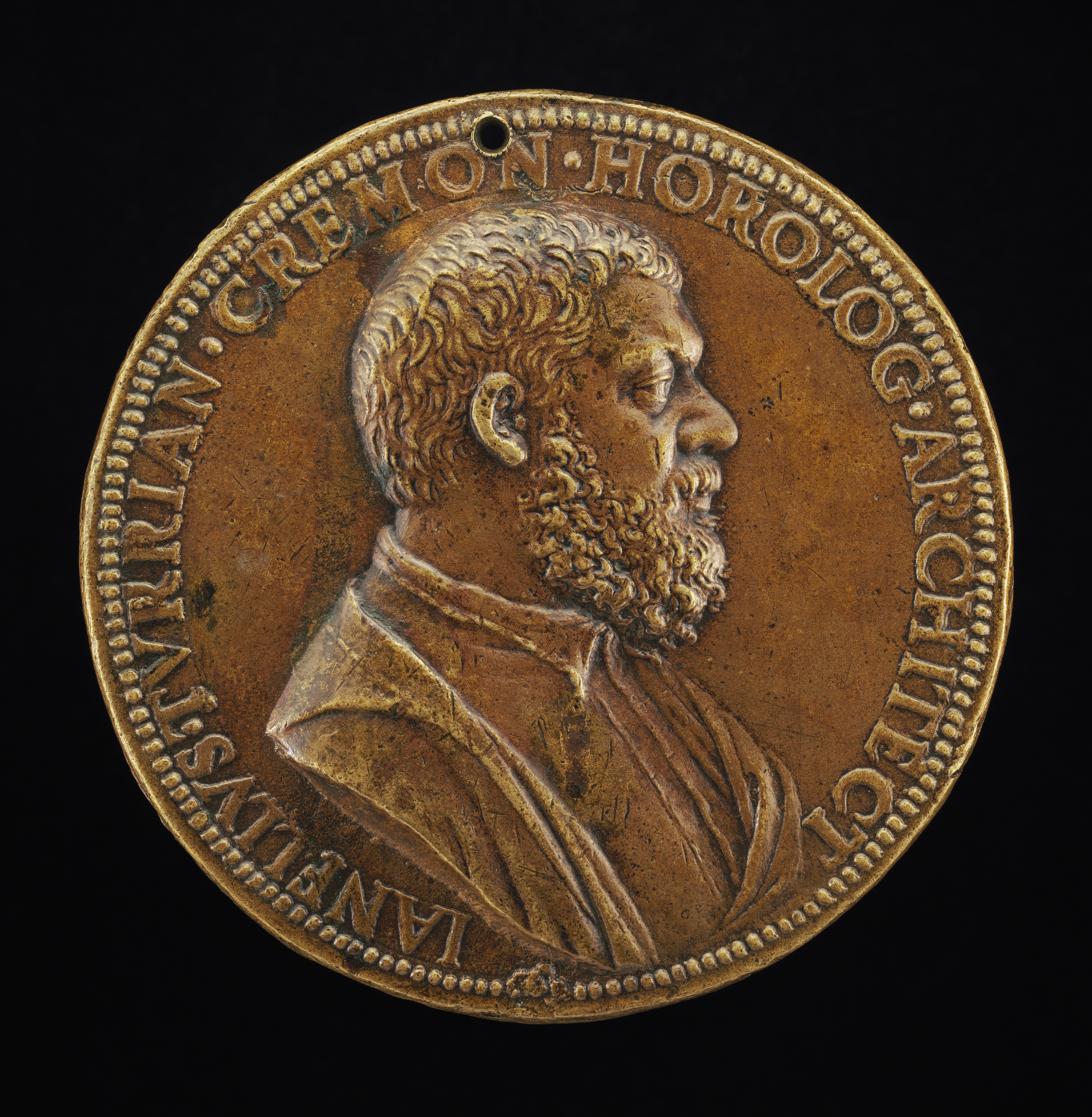
- Contemporary medallion of Gianello by Leone Leoni
- Born: Gianello della Torre; 1500; Cremona, Duchy of Milan
- Died: 1585 (aged 85); Toledo, Spain
- Resting place: Toledo, Spain

Gianello della Torre (c. 1500 – 13 June 1585) was an Italian clockmaker, engineer and mathematician. He was born in Cremona.

== Name ==
The name of Gianello della Torre comes in a number of variations. His original name was Janello Torresani. His given name was long thought to be derived from Giovanni, but is in fact unrelated. Its etymology is uncertain. In the form Ianellus, it was the name of Gianello's grandfather. The form Zanello is also attested. In some sources, his first name appears as Lionello, Leonello, Leo or Giano.

His surname is given as de' Torresani, de' Torexanis, de Torrexanis, della Torre, Torresan, Torresani, Toresani, Torriani and Torriano. His full name in Spanish is Juanelo Turriano.

== Biography ==
Called to Spain in 1529 by Charles V, Holy Roman Emperor, he was appointed Court Clock Master and built the Cristalino, an astronomical clock that made him famous in his time. Philip II of Spain named him Matemático Mayor. He worked and lived in Toledo, where he built the Artificio de Juanelo, an engine that, driven by the river itself, lifted water from the Tagus to a height of almost 100 meters, to supply the city and its castle (Alcázar). He, however, did not get to be properly paid for its expenses.

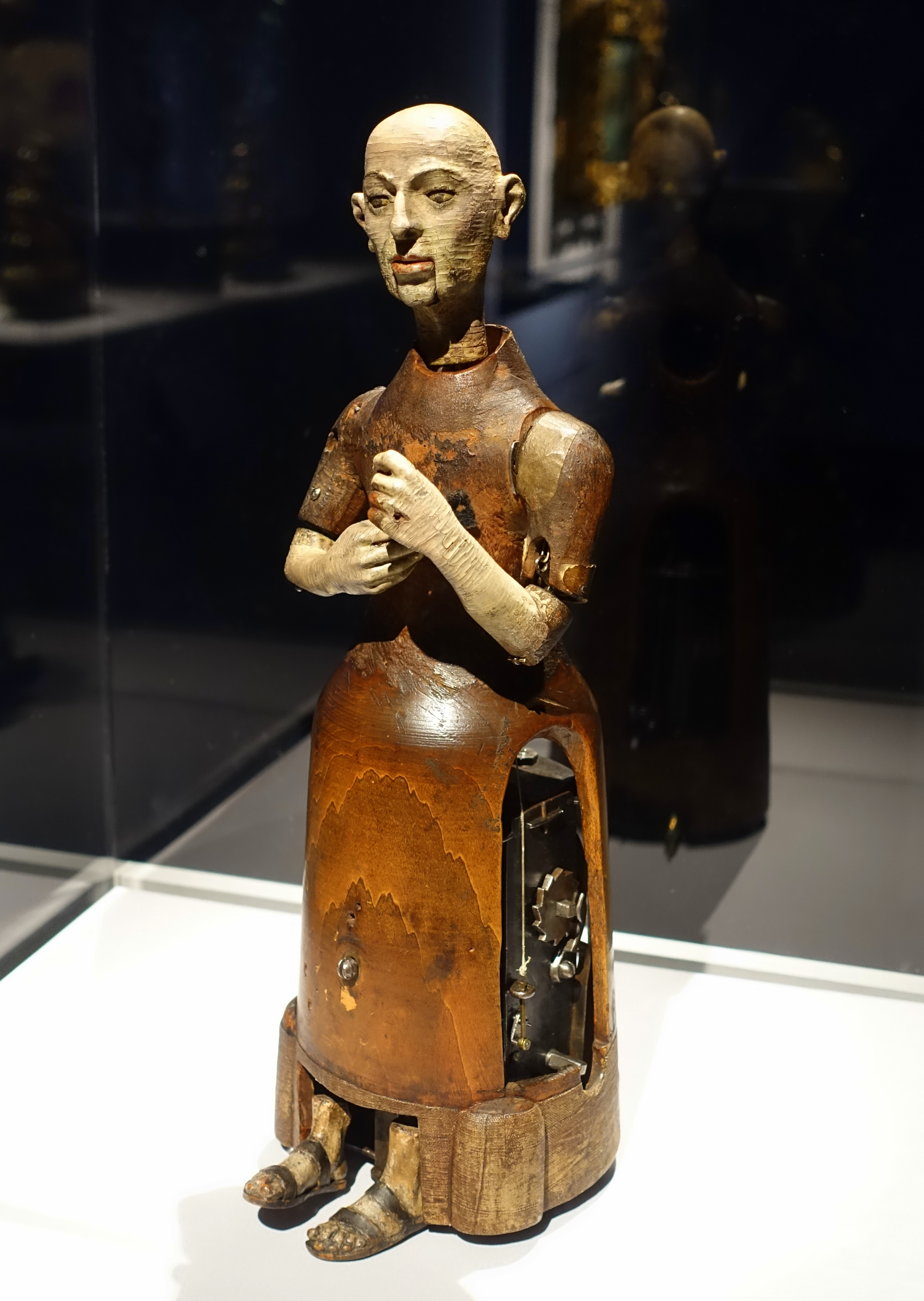
The monk automaton exhibited in the Metropolitan Museum of Art in 2020.

Della Torre is attributed as the creator of the "Clockwork Prayer", an automaton representing a monk manufactured in the 1560s based on a commission from Philip II of Spain. Following the recovery of his son, and in the belief that Didacus of Alcalá had in some way intervened on his behalf, King Philip II of Spain would have commissioned Della Torre, mechanic to his father, to build a clockwork model of Didacus. The model would perform a number of set actions, including the beating of the breast which accompanies the Mea culpa prayer. An automaton of similar age, functions, and appearance is in the collections of the National Museum of American History, Smithsonian Institution.

Another automaton associated with Della Torre is a figure of a lady playing a lute housed in the Kunsthistorisches Museum, Vienna.

He died at Toledo on 13 June 1585.

== Bibliography ==
- García Tapia, Nicolás (2018). "Turriano, Giovanni". Diccionario Biográfico Español. Real Academia de la Historia.
- Zanetti, Cristiano (2017). Janello Torriani and the Spanish Empire: A Vitruvian Artisan at the Dawn of the Scientific Revolution. Brill.
- Zanetti, Cristiano (2019). "Torriani, Janello". Dizionario Biografico degli Italiani, Volume 96: Toja–Trivelli (in Italian). Rome: Istituto dell'Enciclopedia Italiana. ISBN 978-8-81200032-6.
