= José María Sanz Pastor =

Spanish politician and diplomat (1941–2025)

José María Sanz-Pastor Mellado (16 July 1941 – 12 January 2025) was a Spanish politician and diplomat. As a member of the Union of the Democratic Centre (UCD), he was the civil governor of the provinces of Cádiz (1977–1980), Alicante (1980) and Seville (1980–1982). He was the ambassador to Tanzania (1991–1997) and Ireland (1997–2000).

== Biography ==
=== Education ===
Sanz Pastor was born in Lorca in the Region of Murcia. He earned a doctorate in international comparative law and in journalism, as well as having a degree in international trade. In 1968, he joined the diplomatic service.

=== Civil governor ===
During the Spanish transition to democracy under the premiership of Adolfo Suárez, Sanz Pastor was the civil governor of the Province of Cádiz. In 1980 he briefly held the same office in the Province of Alicante but was dismissed by the regional captain-general Jaime Milans del Bosch, who would two months later become the only general to support the failed 1981 Spanish coup attempt. In the same role in the Province of Seville, Sanz Pastor resisted that coup in February, and was remembered fondly by local Spanish Socialist Workers' Party (PSOE) politicians, who feared retribution if the military returned to power.

Weeks earlier, in January 1981, Sanz Pastor ordered police to use rubber bullets and smoke bombs to break up an unauthorised protest in the city of Seville. The PSOE called for his resignation while the Communist Party of Spain (PCE) tabled a motion condemning him in the provincial deputation, which did not pass due to the PSOE's abstention. Sanz Pastor blamed the PCE for allegedly organising the protest.

In April 1981, the town of Marinaleda went on hunger strike over rural unemployment, with protests spreading to nearby towns. There were severe health complications for participants. Sanz Pastor was criticised by the PSOE who said that he was denying the event and not sending aid, to which he responded that they had to be more concrete in their accusations.

In Sanz Pastor's leaving speech in January 1983, he praised the Socialist President of the Regional Government of Andalusia, Rafael Escuredo, as the best in Spain. He quoted phrases from Karl Marx and Vladimir Lenin saying that when the left comes to power, it does not stay leftist, leading to the vice president joking that Andalusia was so special that the UCD would quote Lenin.

=== Ambassador ===
In 1983, Sanz Pastor was named the general consul in Perpignan in France. As Spain's ambassador to Tanzania from 1991 to 1997, he was also the country's representative in Rwanda, Burundi, Madagascar, Mauritius and Comoros. He was the ambassador to Ireland from 1997 to 2000; in August 1998 he was invited by President Mary McAleese to a memorial service at St Patrick's Cathedral, Dublin following the Omagh bombing.

=== Later life and death ===
Sanz Pastor was chosen as the crier for Lorca's Semana Santa celebrations in 2010. He died on 12 January 2025 in Madrid, at the age of 83.
