= Keratomileusis =

Surgical reshaping of the cornea

- Other names: Corneal reshaping
- ICD-9-CM: 11.71

Keratomileusis, from Greek κέρας (kéras: horn) and σμίλευσις (smíleusis: carving), or corneal reshaping, is the improvement of the refractive state of the cornea by surgically reshaping it. It is the most common form of refractive surgery. The first usable technique was developed by José Ignacio Barraquer, commonly called "the father of modern refractive surgery."

The most common modern procedure, LASIK, is performed through lifting the front surface of the eye by forming a thin hinged flap under which the shape of the cornea is changed by using an excimer laser or other surgical device. A microkeratome is usually used to cut the flap, but a femtosecond laser can also be used to make the flap.

Before the advent of the excimer laser, keratomileusis was done using a cryolathe, which froze thin flaps of corneal tissue and lathe cut them much like one cuts the lens of a pair of glasses. After thawing, these reshaped flaps were placed under the front flap to reshape the cornea.

== See also ==
- Orthokeratology
