= Microkeratome =

Precision surgical instrument used instead of a laser in eye surgery

A microkeratome is a precision surgical instrument with an oscillating blade designed for creating the corneal flap in LASIK or ALK surgery. The normal human cornea varies from around 500 to 600 μm in thickness; and in the LASIK procedure, the microkeratome creates an 83 to 200 μm thick flap. The microkeratome uses an oscillating blade system, which has a blade that oscillates horizontally as the blade travels vertically for a precise cut. This piece of equipment is used all around the world to cut the cornea flap. The microkeratome is also used in Descemet's stripping automated endothelial keratoplasty (DSAEK), where it is used to slice a thin layer from the back of the donor cornea, which is then transplanted into the posterior cornea of the recipient. It was invented by Jose Barraquer and Cesar Carlos Carriazo in the 1950s in Colombia.

As of 2023, there are two options for cutting into the cornea, the microkeratome and the femtosecond laser. The femtosecond laser emits ultrashort pulses that act as a blade to cut through the eye with precision and accuracy. Many surgeons differ in using a femtosecond laser or a microkeratome for their operations. Most surgeons and patients prefer the bladeless femtosecond laser.

== History ==
The microkeratome was created in 1948 by Jose Ignacio Barraquer Moner in Bogota, Colombia. Barraquer was known as the father of refractive surgery due to his lifetime involvement and findings in the field. He developed the microkeratome for his keratomileusis (surgical reshaping of the cornea) procedure to correct the refractive error in the eye, which has evolved into the LASIK surgery of the 21st century. Refractive error is caused by an imperfect cornea that disallows light from correctly refracting and focusing on the retina, which results in blurry images. Correcting refractive error was Barraquer's expertise and as time went on he continued to alter his method to correct refractive error. In 1958, Barraquer performed a lamellar resection in situ(corneal tissue replacement), where he used a prototype microkeratome that moved along a ring without a guide. By 1962, Barraquer created a more accurate microkeratome with a suction ring that would act as a guide. The suction ring suctioned the eye in place to create pressure for a precise cut. Barraquer's surgery required the creation of a free flap, which meant the cornea was completely cut through. In 1991, Ioannis Pallikaris introduced the concept of a corneal hinge, which kept the cornea flap attached and helped with the healing process. During the same year, the motorized microkeratome was released. The motorized microkeratome contained a system of gears that ensured a constant blade velocity for a consistent flap thickness.

As the microkeratome gained exposure, surgical instrument corporations such as Moria Surgical, Chiron(bought by Bausch and Lomb Surgical), and Advanced Medical Optics began to create their microkeratomes. Moria Surgical still produces microkeratomes, but Chiron and Advanced Medical Optics have discontinued microkeratomes due to the femtosecond laser's popularity. The Moria Surgical microkeratome was special because they created the first single-use microkeratome in 1999, which led to fewer complications regarding the blade. Chiron created the hansatome microkeratome, which became known as the industry standard for its safety and consistency. The hansatome also created an upper hinge, which lowered the risk of flap displacement from blinking. Advanced Medical Optics created the amadeus microkeratome, which used a single-hand design that lowered the learning curve for new surgeons.

As of 2023, the microkeratome is barely being used due to the increased use of the femtosecond laser. A few surgeons use the microkeratome due to lower cost and comfort with a microkeratome[8]. However, most surgeons and patients tend to prefer the bladeless femtosecond laser, due to its precision and safety.

== Components ==
=== Suction ring ===
During the keratectomy(surgical removal of a layer of the cornea) the suction ring fixates and stiffens the eye. Depending on the required flap diameter and the form of the cornea, different suction rings are employed. The upper part of the suction ring(plate) allocates the cornea with variable diameters. A flexible silicone tubing connects the central section to the ring's suction chamber. On the vertical outer part of the suction ring, there is a skirt that allows hermetic sealing for proper suction. All these parts are used together to create the suction ring. Using the correct suction ring minimizes the risk of complications.

=== Microkeratome cutting head ===
The microkeratome cutting head consists of a non-vibrating block and an oscillating blade unit. The non-vibrating block is composed of a tracking system, applanation plate, and cavities. The tracking system matches to the suction ring to connect the head to the ring using corresponding grooves. The applanation plate is the part of the block that precedes the oscillating blade and flattens the cornea, to create a constant angle for the blade for a constant flap thickness. The cavities of the block are used to hold the oscillating blade unit in place. The oscillating blade unit has a blade made of stainless steel or chrome-platinum. The standard oscillation speed of the blade is 15,000 rpm with an engagement angle between 24° and 30° depending on the required flap thickness. The direction of the cut determines the type of corneal flaps created on the cornea.

=== Drive unit ===
The drive unit is attached to the microkeratome head to ensure that the drive axis fits the blade and oscillates correctly. The drive unit uses either a single or dual electric motor for automated translation. For manual head translation, a gas turbine is used for blade oscillation.

=== Central unit ===
The central unit delivers the energy needed to power the drive unit and creates pressure between the eyeball and the suction ring. One pedal is used to start and stop the pressure for the suction ring. The second pedal controls the blade oscillation of the microkeratome.

== Mechanism of operation ==
During refractive eye surgery, the microkeratome section is done manually or automatically by the surgeon in around 5 seconds. The automated propulsion of the head offers a steady velocity to produce a constant flap thickness, while when done manually, the velocity is inconsistent, which will create an irregular flap thickness.

First, the microkeratome is fixated onto the eye by placing a suction ring onto the cornea with the pupil in the center to stabilize the eye. The suction ring comes in either disposable plastic or metal and applies pressure from about 60 to 160 mm Hg, to stabilize the eye for a clean cut. After, the surgeon places topical anesthetic to moisten the cornea for the cut. Then, the head of the microkeratome is docked onto the suction ring so that it can glide across. The oscillating blade of the microkeratome then proceeds across the eye at a steady velocity, so that the thickness of the flap created is precise. For a more precise flap thickness, the surgeon must pay attention to the blade's sharpness, protrusion, angle, oscillation speed, and velocity. In general, the slower the velocity, the thicker the cut in the cornea. The microkeratome then reverses out of the cut, which allows the suction to be released from the eye to decrease the risk of epithelial defects. After the cut is created, the eye surgery can proceed as required. The blade of the microkeratome can be reused, but most surgeons use a new blade for each eye since slight dullness can cause complications.

== Advantages ==
The microkeratome is a tool that has remained reliable throughout its history. The microkeratome comes with many benefits including speed, comfort, and price. The microkeratome operation only takes around 5 seconds. Since the operation is short, the suction duration is short, which allows the patient to be more comfortable. Also, after the procedure, the microkeratome causes less inflammation when compared to the femtosecond laser. Additionally, surgery using a microkeratome costs much less than femtosecond laser surgery. In the US, cost for LASIK surgery with a microkeratome is around $1,500 per eye, while laser surgery costs around $2,500 per eye.

== Complications ==
Both the microkeratome and femtosecond laser have low complication rates, with the microkeratome at approximately 0.6% and the femtosecond laser at 0.3%. Rare complications arise including the buttonhole flap, irregular flap, thin flap, incomplete flap, small flap, or free cap. These are all different imperfect flaps that force the abandonment of the surgery. To avoid these flap complications there are a set of rules regarding different eye types, such as a flat cornea, steep cornea, small cornea, and large cornea.

The most common complication with a microkeratome is an epithelial defect, the loss of focal areas of the epithelium. The defect can cause pain, tearing, blurry vision, redness, and photophobia. This is caused by the microkeratome's shearing force effect on the epithelium from the basement membrane.

== See also ==
- Instruments used in general surgery
