= Artificio de Juanelo =

16th-century engineering devices in Spain

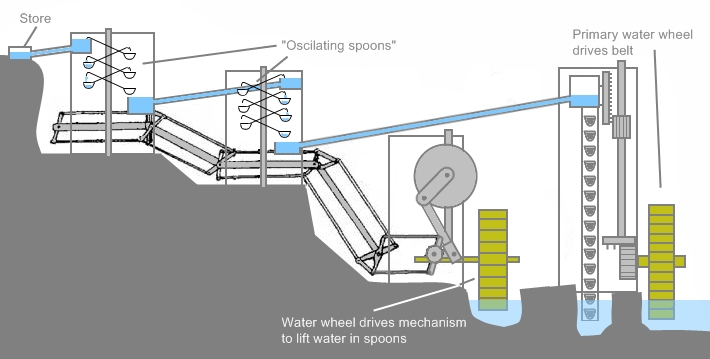
Ladislao Reti believes the Artificio de Juanelo comprised a number of interconnected systems driven by two water wheels

The Artificio de Juanelo ("Gianello's artifice") was the name of two devices built in Toledo in the 16th century by Juanelo Turriano. They were designed to supply the city with a source of readily available water by lifting it from the Tagus (Tajo) river to the Alcázar. Now in ruins, the precise details of the operation of the devices are unknown, but at the time they were considered engineering wonders.

== History ==
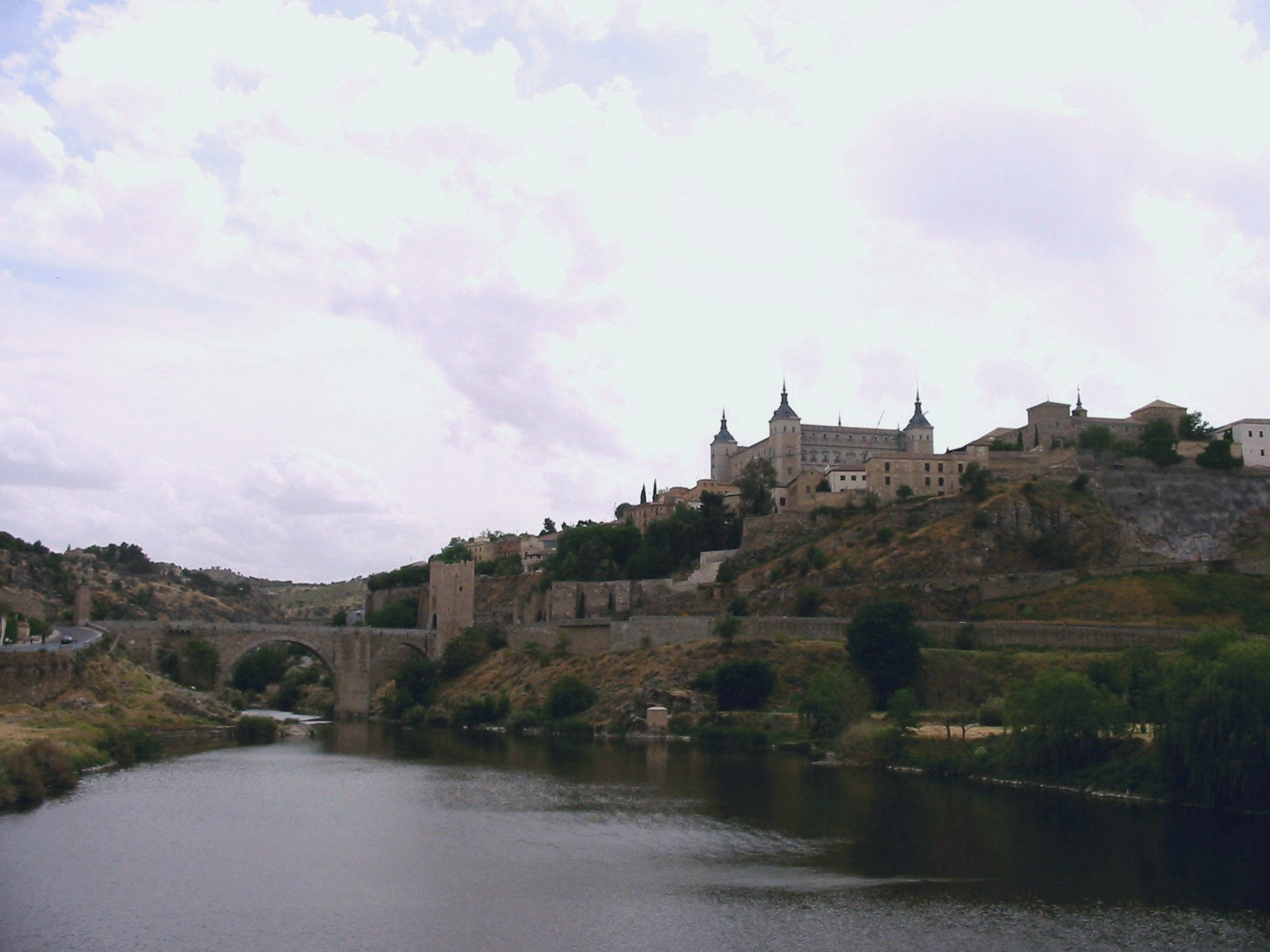
A modern view of the Tagus by Toledo. The Alcázar is on top.

Juanelo Turriano, an Italian-Spanish clock maker, engineer and mathematician, was called to Spain in 1529 and appointed Court Clock Master by the Holy Roman Emperor, Charles V. By 1534 he was working in Toledo, then the capital of the Spanish Empire. Both the Roman aqueduct that had originally supplied the city with water and a giant water wheel constructed by the Moors during the time of the Caliphate of Córdoba had been destroyed and various attempts to supply the demands of the growing city with water by employing the technologies of the time had failed. When Turriano arrived in Toledo, asses were being used to transport pitchers of water from the river to the city. This involved a climb of about 100 metres (330 ft) over uneven ground and was highly inefficient.

Sometime after his arrival in Toledo, Turriano was challenged by Alfonso de Avalos, Marqués de Vasto, to provide a method of transporting water from the Tagus to supply the city. Turriano produced detailed plans for the device but various stoppages and obstacles hindered the construction, among which was the death of Charles V in 1558. Although his successor, Philip II was not as interested in engineering as his father had been and the prestige that Turriano had enjoyed under Charles diminished under his son, Philip nevertheless recognized the value of Turriano, named him Matemático Mayor and employed him on various engineering projects. Although it appears that at times the construction of the water lifting device may have been abandoned, by 1565 Turriano had managed to re-exert his control over the project and contracted with the city council to provide water to the amount of 1,600 pitchers daily (which amounted to around 12,400 litres (3,275 US gallons)) to the city on a permanent basis within three years.

The exact start date of operation is unknown, but by 1568 the machine was delivering around 14,100 litres (3,725 US gallons) a day, well over the agreed levels. However, the city refused to pay Turriano the agreed price, arguing that since the water was stored at the Alcázar it was for the exclusive use of the royal palace, rather than the town. Frustrated by the council's refusal to pay, and in debt from the costs of the device's construction, Turriano entered into another agreement, underwritten by the Crown, to build a second device for the supply of the city. However, it was agreed that this time he and his heirs would retain the rights for the operation. This second version was completed in 1581, and although the Crown paid the costs of construction, Turriano was unable to cover the costs of maintenance and was forced to give up control of the machine to the city. He died shortly afterwards in 1585.

The machines continued to operate until around 1639 when thefts of parts and lack of maintenance led to both machines falling into disrepair. The first machine was disassembled and the second left standing as a symbol of the city, but operation ceased and water once again had to be transported in pitchers on the backs of asses. Further theft of parts reduced the second machine to ruins, and nowadays little of it remains.

== Operation ==
The device caused a great sensation as the height to which the water was raised was more than double what had been previously achieved. Various waterwheel constructions had previously managed modest lifts, but before the construction of the Artificio, the highest lift had been just under 40 metres (130 ft) at Augsburg using an Archimedean screw.

The details of the construction are the subject of debate, but the most widely accepted design is that proposed by Ladislao Reti, based on fragments of contemporary descriptions. A large water wheel powered a revolving belt with buckets or amphora that transported water to the top of a tower. When the buckets reached the top of the tower they would upend pouring the water into a small tank from where it would travel down to a smaller tower via a pipe. A second water wheel provided mechanical power to pumps that drove a series of cups mounted on arms inside the second tower. The arms of the cups were hollow with an opening at the end which allowed water to run down inside the arm and out of the opposite end. A see-sawing motion of the arms lifted the water to successive levels in the cups. Once the final level was reached the water flowed down a second pipe to a third tower which contained further cups on arms and was also activated by the mechanical power derived from the second water wheel. This final tower raised the water high enough to allow it to flow into the storage tanks at the Alcázar.
