= Jose Barraquer =

Spanish ophthalmologist and inventor (1916–1998)

The Most Excellent José Barraquer OAXS
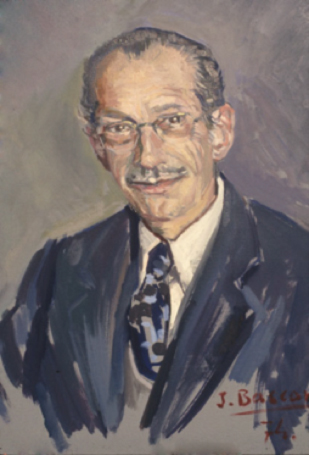
- Born: José Ignacio Barraquer Moner; 24 January 1916; Barcelona, Spain
- Died: 13 February 1998 (aged 82); Bogotá, Colombia

José Ignacio Barraquer Moner (24 January 1916 – 13 February 1998) was a Spanish ophthalmologist and inventor born in Barcelona who did most of his life's work in Bogotá, Colombia.

His original pioneering investigations on corneal transplants and correction of corneal refraction led him to be designated as the “father of refractive surgery”. His ophthalmological surgical techniques and inventions are now in routine use by the ophthalmic community.

== Biography ==
He was born in Barcelona, first son of Ignacio Barraquer (March 25, 1884 – May 13, 1965) and Josefa Moner Raguer (1893-1987).

His grandfather, José Antonio Barraquer i Roviralta (1852-1924) was a pioneer of modern ophthalmology in Spain and a great histopathologist, and the brother of Lluis Barraquer i Roviralta (1855-1928), a pioneer of neurology and the founder, in 1882, of the first department of clinical neurology and electrotherapy in Spain; his son Lluis Barraquer Ferré (1887-1959) and his grandson Lluis Barraquer Bordas (1923-2010) were also famous neurologists.

Jose Ignacio Barraquer's father was a prestigious ophthalmologist in his own right due to the invention of phacoeresis, a surgical procedure for cataract extraction. He educated his son in arts and sciences since early childhood, helping him to become an inventor, a scientist and a skillful surgeon.

He studied medicine in the University of Barcelona and graduated 1940; in 1952 he obtained his doctorate in medicine and surgery at the University of Madrid. He trained in ophthalmology under the mentorship of his father, but also spent time visiting the most famous ophthalmic professors around Europe.

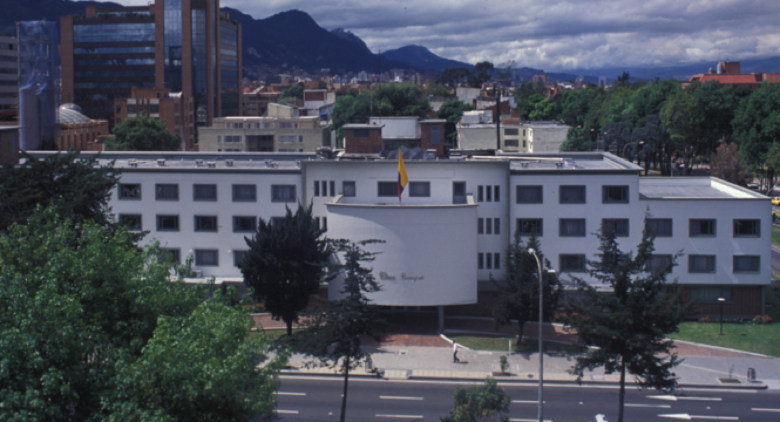
Clínica Barraquer in Bogotá, Colombia

In 1938, towards the end of the Spanish Civil War, he married Margarita Coll Colomé in Granada (deceased 1984), where the family had been living during the war years. They had four children: Ignacio (born 1938–2012), Francisco (1940-2020) ophthalmologist, Margarita (born 1941) and Carmen (born 1946) ophthalmologist and refractive surgeon at "Clinica Barraquer".

In 1940 the family moved back to Barcelona and what is now the Centro de Oftalmología Barraquer, was inaugurated in 1941; José Ignacio continued to work with his father until 1953 when he left Spain to start an independent career in ophthalmology. He decided to settle in Bogotá, Colombia, after having traveled all around South America as an invited lecturer and surgeon.

He founded the Instituto Barraquer de América in 1964, his own Clínica Barraquer in 1968 and the Escuela Superior de Oftalmología within the Instituto Barraquer de América in 1977.

He married Inés Granados in 1985, mother of his fifth child Jose Ignacio Barraquer Granados (born 1965) ophthalmologist and refractive surgeon at "Clinica Barraquer".

Nowadays Jose's legacy, Clinica Barraquer of America is a reference centre for ophthalmology and refractive surgery around the world. His dream of developing ophthalmology and refractive surgery is continued by his descendants Carmen Barraquer and Jose Ignacio Barraquer Granados among other ophthalmologists that had the opportunity to work with him.

== Research and development ==
In his first ophthalmological article, published in 1942, he presented his first ophthalmological instrument, the Barraquer Keratotome with pneumatic fixation which he created to perform more precise cataract incisions.

From then until 1950, he published 56 articles among which the most notable are Air injection in the anterior chamber in cataract surgery (1946), Histiotherapy (1948),Curare in Ocular surgery (1949), Current selection technique in Keratoplasty (1949) in which he described the “edge to edge” suturing technique in penetrating grafts, routinely used in corneal grafts since then; and Refractive Keratoplasty (1949), his first article on the optical theory to correct myopia and hyperopia by modifying the anterior corneal radius of curvature, published in Spanish, English, French and German.

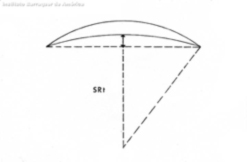

In Colombia, he continued his research and developments in corneal transplants, refractive keratoplasty and lens surgery. In 1956 he published The microscope in ocular surgery and The continuous edge to edge suture in full thickness grafts ; he designed and built several new surgical instruments like the hemostatic forceps, cataract scissors, trephines for corneal grafts and the “colibri blefarostat (hummingbird belpharostat) for anterior segment surgery”. This last instrument was an idea of his first pupil in Bogotá, Enrique Ariza Henao, and was described in the journal “Archivos de la Sociedad Americana de Oftalmología y Optometría” that he started in 1958.

Meanwhile, he continued to advance his research in refractive keratoplasty in his private home laboratory; in 1958 he published Method for cutting lamellar grafts in frozen corneas, new orientation for refractive surgery and Cinematography of ocular operations . In the meantime between 1962 and 1964 he designed and made several precision surgical instruments by hand including the microkeratome, pneumatic fixation rings, applanation tonometers, and applanation lenses to measure the diameter of the resection made with the microkeratome, and he perfected “the Lathe to cut spherical surfaces”.

In 1963 he published Two level keratoplasty, Modification of corneal refraction by means of intracorneal inclusions . In 1964 Corneal behavior in response to thickness changes in which he first describes the changes on the anterior radius of corneal curvature, in response to lamellar grafts of different thickness performed in rabbits; Keratomileusis for correcting myopia where he describes the microkeratome, an instrument designed and built by him in 1962, to perform corneal lamellar resections of different diameters and thickness; and New approach, for the surgical correction of myopia . In 1965 he published 19 articles including Our approach in Pterygium surgery explaining the free conjunctival graft technique; The corneo-conjuntival limbal reconstruction before a corneal transplant in which for the first time a graft of limbus tissue was recommended, and Foundations of Refractive Keratoplasty with a foreword dedicated to his father, where he explains all his research, findings, the microkeratome and the surgical techniques of keratomileusis and keratophakia. In this article he explains "The Law of Thickness'" discovered through his research work, and this became the foundation of LASIK (Laser assisted Keratomileusis) and of every corneal refractive technique that is being performed worldwide.

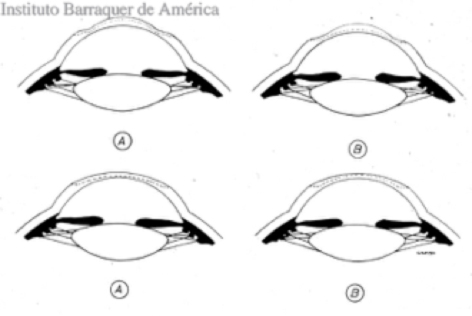

In 1967 he published A new operating microscope for ocular surgery describing a microscope developed jointly with his brother Joaquin Barraquer Moner and the physicist Hans Littmann from Zeiss.

In 1970 he edited and published a book (2 volumes) compiling the available reprints on Refractive Keratoplasty which had appeared in the world literature since 1949.

In 1980 he wrote and published his first book called Keratomileuisis and Keratophakia (1 volume) in which he describes all of his life's research to modify the corneal refraction, his findings, different approaches, mathematical and geometrical foundations, the surgical instruments that he created, results of the surgical techniques of Keratomileusis and Keratophakia in patients, and the complications encountered.

In 1989 he published a second book Refractive Surgery of the Cornea (2 volumes) with the collaboration of Carmen Barraquer-Coll his daughter, and Alejandro Arciniegas-Castilla, revising his first book as well as describing the lamellar and incisional surgical techniques developed by other ophthalmologists to modify corneal refractive power: Radial and astigmatic keratotomies, epikeratophakia and the first steps on laser refractive procedures.

Between 1977 and 1985 he organized and directed refractive surgery training courses at the Barraquer Institute of América in Bogotá, which were attended by over 100 ophthalmologists from all around the world. He also organized five International Forum events in Bogotá, (1970, 1975, 1980, 1984, 1993) that were attended by the leading worldwide ophthalmological professors.

During his professional life, he wrote 268 articles and invented 19 surgical techniques and 45 surgical instruments.

== Awards ==
- 1968 - Grand Honor Award for outstanding Achievements. Society of Cryo-Ophthalmology
- 1972 – Distinguished Service Prize Award for Excellency in Ophthalmology-Society of Contemporary Ophthalmology (U.S.A)
- 1976 – Gold Medal to the Microsurgeon of the Year. - World Microsurgery congress (U.S.A)
- 1982 – Karl Wessely Gold Medal- Augenerztliche Fortbildung (Germany)
- 1983 – José Ignacio Barraquer Moner Medal and Lecture – The International Society of Refractive Surgery (U.S.A)
- 1985 – Escudo Virgili- Facultad de Medicina de la Universidad de Cadiz (Spain)
- 1987 – First Albrecht von Graefe Award for distinguished contributions to Refractive Surgery.–The American Society of Contemporary Ophthalmology (U.S.A)
- 1987 – Medaglia D’Oro “ G.Cirincione” – Universita de la Sapienza di Roma (Italy)
- 1987 – Gold Medal Leonardo da Vinci – National Eye Research Foundation (Chicago – U.S.A)
- 1994 – Award “The ophthalmologist of the Century”. The International surgery Club (Montreal-Canada)
- 1998 – The Most Influential Ophthalmologists of the Twentieth Century.- The American Society of Cataract and Refractive Surgery (Seattle- U.S.A)

== Decorations ==
- 1968 – Commander of the Order of San Carlos (Colombia)
- 1968 – Commander with Plaque of the Civil Order of Alfonso X, the Wise (Spain)
- 1976 – Silver Medal of Merit in Labour – Ministry of Labour (Spain)
- 1977 – Caballero de Honor y Mérito de la Orden de Malta (priorato de U.S.A)
- 1980 - Commander of the Order of Boyaca (Colombia)
- 1983 – Gran Cruz de San Jorge y Constantino el Grande - Orden Constantiniana de San Jorge (Colombia)
- 1984 – Grand Officer of the Order of Boyaca (Colombia)
- 1995 - Grand Cross of the Civil Order of Alfonso X, the Wise (Spain)

== Academic distinctions ==
- 1961-1973 - Visiting professor of Ophthalmology – Baylor University, College of Medicine, (Houston, U.S.A)
- 1967 – Académico de Honor de la Real Academia de Medicina de Murcia (Spain)
- 1969 – Awarded title of doctor honoris causa by the Federal University of Santa Maria (Brasil)
- 1970 – Miembro de Mérito de la Academia de Ciencias Médicas de Barcelona (Spain)
- 1975 - Honorary Professor in the National University of San Marcos (Perú)
- 1987 – Awarded title of doctor honoris causa by the University of Cádiz (Spain)
- 1990 – Awarded title of doctor honoris causa in ophthalmology by the University of Cartagena

(Colombia)
