= Ignacio Barraquer =

Spanish ophthalmologist (1884–1965)

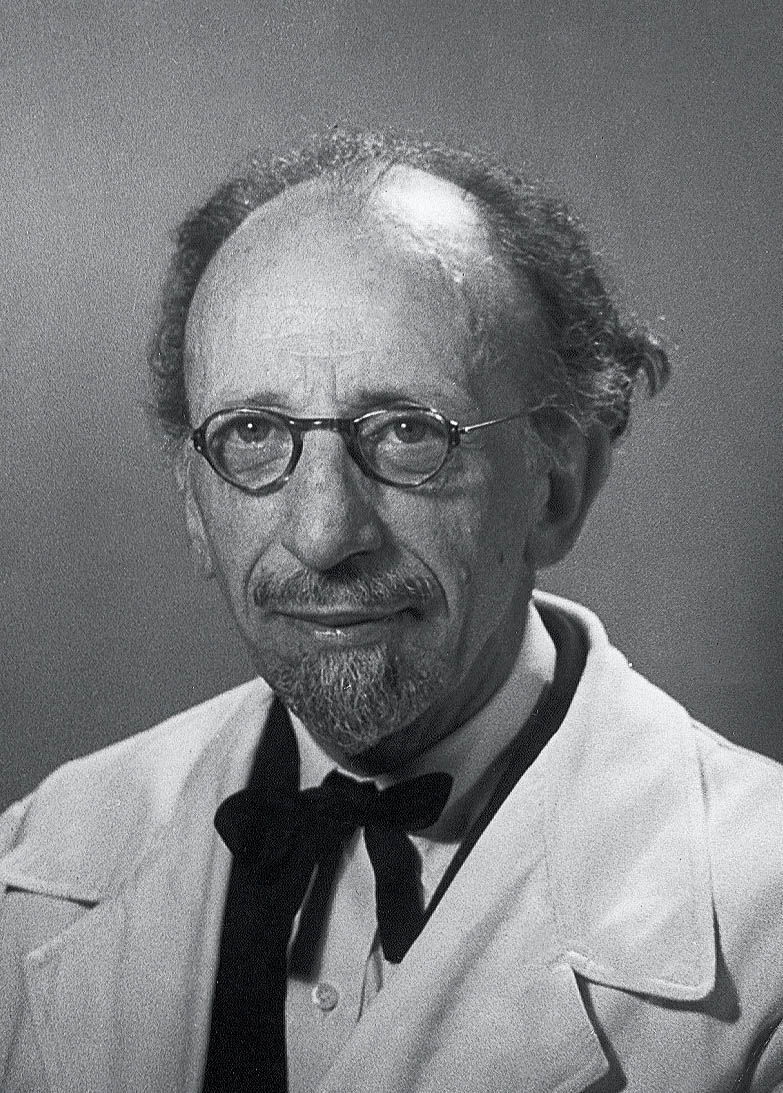
Ignacio Barraquer

Ignacio Barraquer Barraquer (March 25, 1884 – May 13, 1965) was a Spanish ophthalmologist known for his contributions to the advancement of cataract surgery. Barraquer was born in Barcelona, Catalonia, Spain. He was the father of Jose Barraquer, also an ophthalmologist known for pioneering works in refractive surgery.

Ignacio Barraquer received his medical doctorate in 1908 in Barcelona, and upon his father's retirement, was appointed Acting Professor of Ophthalmology at the School of Medicine, held until 1923. He invented many surgical instruments and procedures involving cataract surgery, many of which are named after him; some among them the suction cup that extracts cataracts, and the fine-tunable vacuum-producing apparatus which allowed the removal of the crystalline lens.

Among his other achievements, Barraquer also founded, planned, and designed the Centro de Oftalmología Barraquer.
