= Russ Prize =

U.S. National Academy of Engineering award since 2001

Fritz J. and Dolores H. Russ Prize
- A gold medal depicting Fritz and Dolores Russ
- Awarded for: Bioengineering
- Date: October 1999
- Location: Ohio
- Country: United States
- Presented by: United States National Academy of Engineering
- Reward: US$500,000
- First award: 2001
- Currently held by: Julio Cesar Palmaz; Leonard Pinchuk; Richard A. Schatz; John B. Simpson; Paul G. Yock
- Website: Official website

The Fritz J. and Dolores H. Russ Prize is an American national and international award established by the United States National Academy of Engineering (NAE) in October 1999 in Athens. Named after Fritz Russ, the founder of Systems Research Laboratories, and his wife Dolores Russ, it recognizes a bioengineering achievement that "has had a significant impact on society and has contributed to the advancement of the human condition through widespread use". The award was instigated at the request of Ohio University to honor Fritz Russ, one of its alumni.

The first Russ Prize was awarded in 2001 to Earl E. Bakken and Wilson Greatbatch. The prize is awarded biennially in odd years. From 2003 to 2011, there was a single winner per award. Multiple winners were recognized starting in 2013. The first non-Americans to receive the Russ Prize were three of the five co-winners honored in 2015.

Only living persons may receive the prize, and recipients of the Charles Stark Draper Prize are not also eligible for the Russ Prize. Members of the NAE and non-members worldwide are able to receive the award.

The winners are announced during National Engineers Week in February. They receive US$500,000, a gold medallion and a hand-scribed certificate. The Russ Prize, the Gordon Prize and the Draper Prize, all awarded by the NAE, are known collectively as the "Nobel Prizes of Engineering".

== Recipients ==
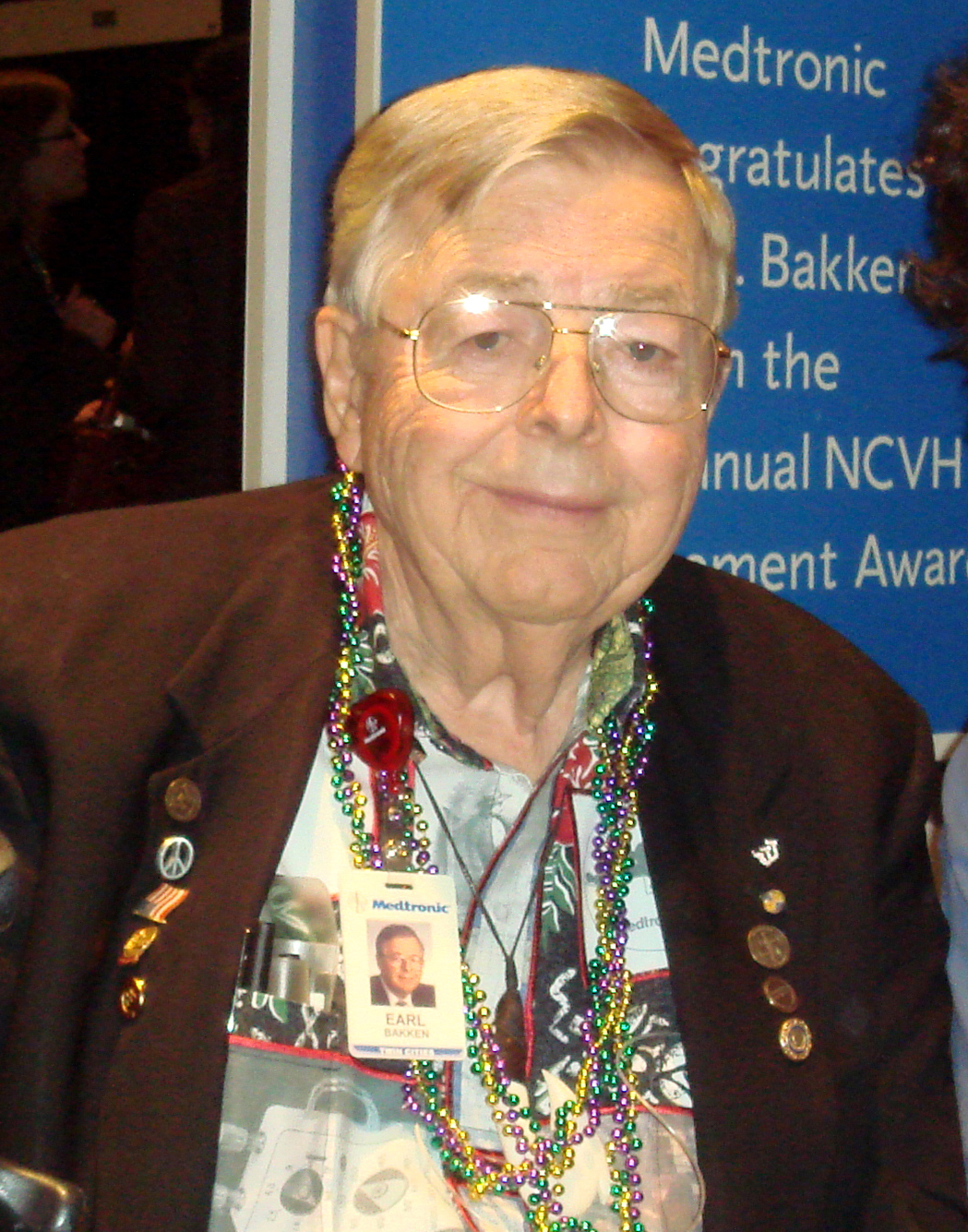
Earl E. Bakken was one of the first persons, along with Wilson Greatbatch, who received the Russ Prize.

Year	Recipient(s)	Nationality	Reason	Reference
2001	Earl E. Bakken and Wilson Greatbatch	US	"for their independent development of the implantable cardiac pacemaker"	
2003	Willem Johan Kolff	US	"for his pioneering work on artificial organs, beginning with the artificial kidney, thus launching a new field that is benefiting the lives of millions"	
2005	Leland Clark	US	"for bioengineering membrane-based sensors in medical, food, and environmental applications"	
2007	Yuan-Cheng Fung	US	"for the characterization and modeling of human tissue mechanics and function leading to prevention and mitigation of trauma"	
2009	Elmer L. Gaden	US	"for pioneering the engineering and commercialization of biological systems for large-scale manufacturing of antibiotics and other drugs"	
2011	Leroy E. Hood	US	"for automating DNA sequencing that revolutionized biomedicine and forensic science"	
2013	Samuel E. Blum, Rangaswamy Srinivasan and James J. Wynne	US	"for the development of laser ablative decomposition, enabling LASIK and PRK eye surgery"	
2015	Graeme Clark, Erwin Hochmair, Ingeborg Hochmair, Michael M. Merzenich, and Blake S. Wilson	Australia, Austria, Austria, US, US	"for engineering cochlear implants that enable the deaf to hear"	
2017	James G. Fujimoto, Adolf F. Fercher, Christoph K. Hitzenberger, David Huang, and Eric A. Swanson	US, Austria, Austria, US, US	"for optical coherence tomography, leveraging creative engineering to invent imaging technology essential for preventing blindness and treating vascular and other diseases"	
2019	Julio Palmaz, Leonard Pinchuk, Richard A. Schatz, John Simpson, and Paul G. Yock	Argentina, US	"For innovations in medical devices that enable minimally invasive angioplasty treatment of advanced coronary artery disease"	
2023	David R. Walt		"For the development of microwell arrays that greatly advanced the fields of genomics and proteomics"	
2025	Ian Shanks	UK	“for the invention of the electrochemical capillary fill device (eCFD), which gives diabetes patients and caregivers accurate and timely blood glucose measurements for diabetes management.”	

== See also ==
- List of engineering awards
