= Hochmair =

Hochmair is a surname. Notable people with the surname include:

- Erwin Hochmair (born 1940), Austrian electrical engineer
- Ingeborg Hochmair (born 1953), Austrian electrical engineer
- Philipp Hochmair (born 1973), Austrian actor
