= Stephen Trokel =

Stephen L. Trokel (born 1934) is an American eye surgeon, known for his contributions in creating and applying excimer lasers in corneal refractive surgery.

== Selected publications ==
- Trokel, Stephen (July 1989). "Evolution of excimer laser corneal surgery". Journal of Cataract and Refractive Surgery. 15 (4): 373–383. doi:10.1016/s0886-3350(89)80054-9. ISSN 0886-3350. PMID 2778684.
- Trokel, Stephen L. (September 1990). "Development of the Excimer Laser in Ophthalmology: A Personal Perspective". Journal of Refractive Surgery. 6 (5): 357–362. doi:10.3928/1081-597X-19900901-13. PMID 2257262.

== See also ==
- Rangaswamy Srinivasan
- Samuel E. Blum
- Marguerite McDonald
- James J. Wynne
