= Geoffrey R. Ball =

American physiologist

Geoffrey R.Ball
- Born: 1964 (age 61–62)
- Education: University of Oregon
- Occupation: MED-EL
- Awards: 1999 Engineer of the Year
- Scientific career
- Fields: Electrical engineering
- Workplaces: MED-EL

Geoffrey R. Ball (born 1964) is an American physiologist specializing in Biomechanics and the inventor of the VIBRANT SOUNDBRIDGE active middle ear implant – a medical device designed to treat his own hearing loss.

Ball has a Bachelor of Science from the University of Oregon (Human Development & Performance – majoring in physiology & biomechanics) and a Master of Science from the University of Southern California (Systems Management). Ball co-founded medical device company Symphonix Devices Inc, which focused on the development of middle ear implants and introduced the VIBRANT SOUNDBRIDGE to the market. Since 2003, Geoffrey Ball has been a Chief Technical Officer at hearing implant manufacturer MED-EL in Innsbruck, Austria and has numerous international patents registered in his name.

== Background ==
As a child, Geoffrey Ball suffered a severe fever attack and developed severe sensorineural hearing loss. Conventional hearing aids were tried as a treatment, however, these brought no benefit. As a young man, he showed interest in active middle ear implants but was advised that the technology was only in its first development phase and therefore could not be used to treat his hearing loss. After completing a Bachelor of Science from the University of Oregon (Human Development & Performance – majoring in physiology & biomechanics) and a Master of Science from the University of Southern California (Systems Management), Ball worked for many years in the fields of neuroscience, biomedical and auditory research. His most notable development during this period was a new type of Laser Doppler Vibrometer, which used signal processing software developed in cooperation with Jont Allen from Bell Labs. The device was the most sensitive optical vibrometer ever developed at the time. Ball was able to use this device to build and test small high-fidelity transducers.

This work led to the development of the Floating Mass Transducer (FMT), a minute electromechanical converter that turns electrical signals into mechanical vibrations. The FMT could be attached to the ossicles, the smallest bones in the body that transmit vibrations from the eardrum to the inner ear. Using this technology, Ball’s team developed the VIBRANT SOUNDBRIDGE, a middle ear implant that comprises an implantable part, known as the VORP, and an audio processor. The device actively vibrates the bones of the middle ear and can be used to treat mild to severe sensorineural hearing loss, as well as conductive or mixed hearing loss. It is often used as an alternative for patients who receive no benefit from hearing aids.

Geoffrey Ball was himself one of the first patients to be implanted with the VIBRANT SOUNDBRIDGE and is currently a bilateral user. He is the only living person known who was implanted with a medical device to cure a chronic medical condition, that he also invented. He continues to use a middle ear device in one ear and is also implanted with a cochlear implant in his second ear.

Ball’s company, Symphonix, was launched in 2011 and later sold to hearing implant manufacturer MED-EL, where he now works as a Chief Technical Officer. The VIBRANT SOUNDBRIDE is still produced by the company today. At MED-EL, Ball also supported the invention of the BONEBRIDGE, the world’s first active transcutaneous bone conduction implant. The device also consists of an internal implant and an external audio processor and can be used to treat conductive and mixed hearing loss, as well as single-sided deafness.

== Personal life ==
Geoffrey Ball was raised in Silicon Valley, California.

Since 2003, Geoffrey Ball has lived just outside Innsbruck, Austria with his wife and son.

He is the author of his 2011 autobiographical book "No More Laughing at the Deaf Boy" (288 pages, Haymon Verlag, Innsbruck-Vienna) that tells the story from his childhood to the creation and sale of his company Symphonix Devices Inc.

His personal experiences as a child with hearing loss has also led Geoffrey Ball to launch “Ideas 4 Ears” young inventor’s competition that encourages children to create innovative ideas that help people with hearing loss.

== Patents ==
Geoffrey Ball has over 102 issued and pending US and international patents covering 26 patent families in the field of hearing implants, drug delivery, neuro-stimulation and other implantable medical devices.

== Achievements / Awards / Prizes ==
1998 Silicon Valley Inventor of the Year

1999 Engineer of the Year

2001 Politzer Society Prize for RTF paper

2002 2nd Annunzio Award in Science and Medicine

2009 Hon. Dr. Implantology Stanford R.Goode Society

2012 Cluster Award (Engineering for Bonebridge)

2013 Red Dot Design Award

2013 Austrian State Prize for Innovation (Science and Medicine)

2013 Life Award

2016 Life Goes On Award

== Publications ==
- Implantable hearing device performance measured by laser doppler interferometry

Gan R;Dormer K;Wood M;Ball G;Dietz T Ear Nose Throat J, 76(5), 1997, p. 297-309

- Scanning laser doppler vibrometry of the middle ear ossicles

Ball G;Huber A;Goode R. Ear Nose Throat J, 76(4), 1997, p. 213-222

- A new implantable middle ear hearing device for mixed hearing loss: a feasibility study in human temporal bones

Huber A;Ball G;Veraguth D;Dillier N;Bodmer D;Sequeira D Otol Neurotol, 00, 2006, p. 00-00

- COMPARISON OF MEASUREMENTS TO DETERMINE TRANSDUCER PERFORMANCE OF AN ACTIVE MIDDLE EAR IMPLANT (AMI)

Winter M.;Ball G;Gnadeberg D.;Weber B.;Battmer R;Lenarz T. -, 2002, p. 581-587

- Partially Implantable Vibrating Ossicular Prosthesis

Dietz TG;Ball GR;Katz BH International Conference on Solid-State Sensors and Actuators, 1997, p. 433-436

- The Vibrant Soundbridge: Design and Development

Ball GR Adv Otorhinolaryngol, 69, 2010, p. 1-13

- Temporal Bone Studies of a Round Window Implantable Hearing Device. Spindel JH, Ball G. Poster Presentation at the 2006 ARO meeting; Baltimore, Maryland. Feb. 5, 2006.
- Laser Doppler vibrometer (LDV)--a new clinical tool for the otologist

Goode RL;Ball G;Nishihara S;Nakamura K Am J Otol, 17(6), 1996 Nov, p. 813-822

- Otologists Test Ears with Optical Laser Interfermoetry

Ball G. Photonics Spectra. 1992 August (8) 96-98

- . . . und ich höre doch! (a.k.a. English version "No more laughing at the deaf boy")

Ball, G. Published Book 2011. P. 1-311. Haymon Verlag, Innsbruck-Wien (www.hymonverlag.at)

- Floating Mass Transducers for Middle Ear Applications Ball G, Maxfield B. Proceedings on Second International Symposium on Electronic Implants 1996:8 p 88-94 (But I think this was published as a side bar in an Italian publication)
- Wenn der Schädelknochen Menschen hören lässt Ball, G. Electronik 11/2013 p 36-40 (electroniknet.de)
