= Herbert E. Kaufman =

American ophthalmologist (1931–2026)

Herbert Edward Kaufman
- Born: September 28, 1931; New York City, U.S.
- Died: July 11, 2026 (aged 94)
- Education: Princeton University; Harvard University
- Known for: Glaucoma, protease inhibitor, virology, Corneal transplant, Excimer laser, Photorefractive keratectomy, LASIK, Eye bank, Natamycin
- Awards: Weisenfeld and Proctor awards from the Association for Research in Ophthalmology (ARVO) MAP award from the Society Ophthalmoligica Montgomery Medal from the Irish Ophthalmological Society Pockington Medal from the Royal Society of Ophthalmology Innovators award from the Association of Cataract and Refractive Surgeons
- Scientific career
- Fields: Ophthalmology
- Workplaces: NIH; University of Florida; Louisiana State University

Herbert Edward Kaufman (September 28, 1931 – July 11, 2026) was an American ophthalmologist who discovered idoxuridine, the first clinically useful antiviral agent; co-developed with William Bourne the clinical specular microscope to view the live corneal endothelium, co-developed timolol with Thomas Zimmerman, a new class of medications to treat glaucoma; corneal storage media for eye banks; natamycin, the first commercially available medication to treat fungal infections of the eye; co-developed with Tony Gasset the use of bandage contact lenses; and was involved in the first laser vision photorefractive keratectomy of the eye with Marguerite McDonald.

== Scientific career ==
Kaufman began his Princeton University education at age 16, where he graduated Phi Beta Kappa and Magna Cum Laude with a degree in chemistry. This was followed by medical school at Harvard University. Kaufman Graduated in 1956 Magna Cum Laude and Alpha Omega Alpha. He received the New England Pathology Society Award for developing a new type of calcium stain for histological tissue preparation.

He performed his Medical Internship at Massachusetts General Hospital, and following that, he worked at the National Institutes of Health (NIH) as a clinical associate for 2 years. While at the NIH much of his research concentrated on the parasite toxoplasma. He was the first to grow toxoplasma in culture. His studies showed that slow growing isolates of toxoplasma were more resistant to treatment and if fast growing toxoplasma isolates were slowed by reducing the temperature, they also became more resistant to treatment with pyrimethamine.

Toward the end of his work at the NIH, Kaufman was asked to be the first Chairman of the Department of Ophthalmology at the University of Florida, in Gainesville, Florida. Since he had not yet begun his Ophthalmology residency, the University of Florida Medical School kept the position open until he completed his three-year residency at The Massachusetts Eye and Ear Infirmary of Harvard Medical School, under the training of Claus Dohlman. During his residency, he continued research in toxoplasmosis. He was assisted at this time and throughout his career by a chemical engineer, Emily Varnell. Kaufman became interested in finding a treatment for viral infections. Although there were vaccines to prevent some viruses, there was not a treatment for active viral infections. Kaufman believed that a medication could be found that would interfere with intracellular multiplication of a Herpes virus. During his residency, he pioneered the medical use of 5-iododeoxyuridine (IDU) the first medication to ever successfully treat and cure a viral infection.

== Research and discoveries ==
=== First Anti-Viral Medication: 5-iododeoxyuridine (IDU) ===
5-iododeoxyuridine (IDU) had been synthesized 8 years earlier by William Prusoff as an anticancer medication. Kaufman tested IDU as a possible agent to disrupt viral replication in active Herpes Simplex Virus infections of the eye. IDU was proven effective and resulted in the discovery of the first antiviral agent used in humans to treat an active viral infection. This agent was subsequently used to effectively treat Herpes Simplex keratitis, the primary cause of corneal blindness in the Western world at that time.

Kaufman also developed the use of topical steroids in the treatment course of some corneal infections that were made worse by the host reaction to the infection. [Steroids and ISU Ref] The use of steroids reduced the damage produced by the host reaction and lessened the tissue damage that occurred as part of the infection.

=== Glaucoma Medication: Timolol ===
Yale researcher Marvin Sears, observed that timolol, a beta-adrenergic agent, had an intraocular pressure lowering effect in rabbit eyes when used to dissolve lens zonules. There was reluctance among industry to investigate this drug further in trials because of the absence of a large market. Kaufman identified timolol as a possible therapeutic agent to treat glaucoma and with Thomas Zimmerman, conduct basic science and clinical trials with timolol, at the University of Florida. This introduced an entirely new class of drugs to treat glaucoma; it was ultimately marketed by Merck, Sharp and Dohme.

=== Fungal Corneal Infection Medication: Prymaricin (Natamycin) ===
While at the University of Florida, fungal infections of the eye were common and Kaufman sought to find an effective treatment for use on the eye. He read that a Dutch company used Prymaricin to prevent cheese from getting moldy. He designed an animal model of a fungal infection with which he and his colleague, Emanuel Newman, proved that the substance was efficacious for treating human infection. They provided Prymaricin to clinicians at no cost for a number of years. The medication ultimately received FDA approval without a clinical trial or a manufacturer. Alcon Laboratories later manufactured the drug as Natamycin. Prymaricin (natamycin) is still commonly used today.

=== Bandage Contact Lens ===
With Tony Gasset, Kaufman studied therapeutic soft contact lens (SCL) use to promote corneal healing and reduce pain. They also pioneered the use SCL and collagen shields as a sustained release mechanism for medication to the eye.

=== Cornea Endothelium Microscopy (Specular Microscopy) ===
The specular microscope was developed with Bill Bourne, which showed that the human corneal endothelium divided little or not at all. Thus, this tissue must be protected since it could not effectively repair itself like other human tissue. This also led to the discovery that the corneal endothelium was being damaged during cataract surgery as the cataract was removed and the artificial lens was placed into the eye.

=== Cornea Transplant Tissue storage ===
Prior to the development of corneal storage media for eye banks, corneal transplant surgery generally required corneal transplant surgery to be conducted with hours of the donor's death. This was not always possible; thus, the need for a corneal storage media was born out of need because of the dearth of usable cornea transplant tissue. Kaufman proposed removing the corneas from the enucleated eyes and immersing the corneas in a type of tissue culture solution, which could maintain the health of the stored corneas for days. Kaufman immersed the corneal tissue in a tissue culture solution and later Dextran to dehydrate the tissue at the suggestion of colleague, Bernie McCarey, who validated the idea in 1974.

There was resistance to this new procedure but with the support of Edward Maumenee, head of ophthalmology, Johns Hopkins University, Baltimore, the new protocol was accepted by Eye Banks International. MK media was not patented so that it could be used by eye banks throughout the world, free of charge.

As eye banks required more time for tissue testing and distribution across the country, Kaufman developed K-Sol corneal storage media in 1986. K-sol contained chondroitin sulfate, which was a free radical scavenger to extend the usable life of the tissue in eye bank storage for up to 14 days.

(k-sol reference) K-sol was used for many years but was removed due to a manufacturing contamination by Taylor Pharmacueticals. Kaufman and Richard Lindstrom, modified the k-sol formulation to make Optisol corneal eye bank storage media in 1992. Optisol remains the most commonly used eye bank preserving medium, according to Kaufman.

=== Laser Vision Correction ===
Ultimately, the first human to undergo laser vision correction with the excimer laser was a patient with a uveal melanoma in an eye slated for enucleation who allowed Marguerite McDonald to perform an excimer laser photorefractive keratectomy (PRK). Following enucleation, they performed histologic studies. This was followed by the same work in a series of blind patients who allowed PRK to be performed despite the absence of a benefit to them to forward this technology, which led to the development of LASIK eye surgery. Awards: The Weisenfeld and Proctor awards from the Association for Research in Ophthalmology (ARVO), the MAP award from the Society Ophthalmoligica, The Montgomery Medal from the Irish Ophthalmological Society, The Pockington Medal from the Royal Society of Ophthalmology, 10 outstanding Men of the year by the US Chamber of Commerce, The Innovators award from the Association of Cataract and Refractive Surgeons and others.

Kaufman was the editor of Investigative Ophthalmology and Visual Science and served on the Editorial Boards of a number of journals, including the American Journal of Ophthalmology. He has been president of the Association for Research in Vision and Ophthalmology, the Contact Lens Association of Ophthalmologists, and the International Society of Refractive Keratoplasty and has served two terms on the Advisory Council of the National Eye Institute. He has more than 700 publications in his bibliography, including work on herpesvirus and ocular disease, antiviral drugs, corneal surgery, and refractive surgery.

== Death ==
Kaufman died on July 11, 2026, at the age of 94.
