= MED-EL =

Multinational medical device company

Coordinates: 47.2625°N 11.3740°E

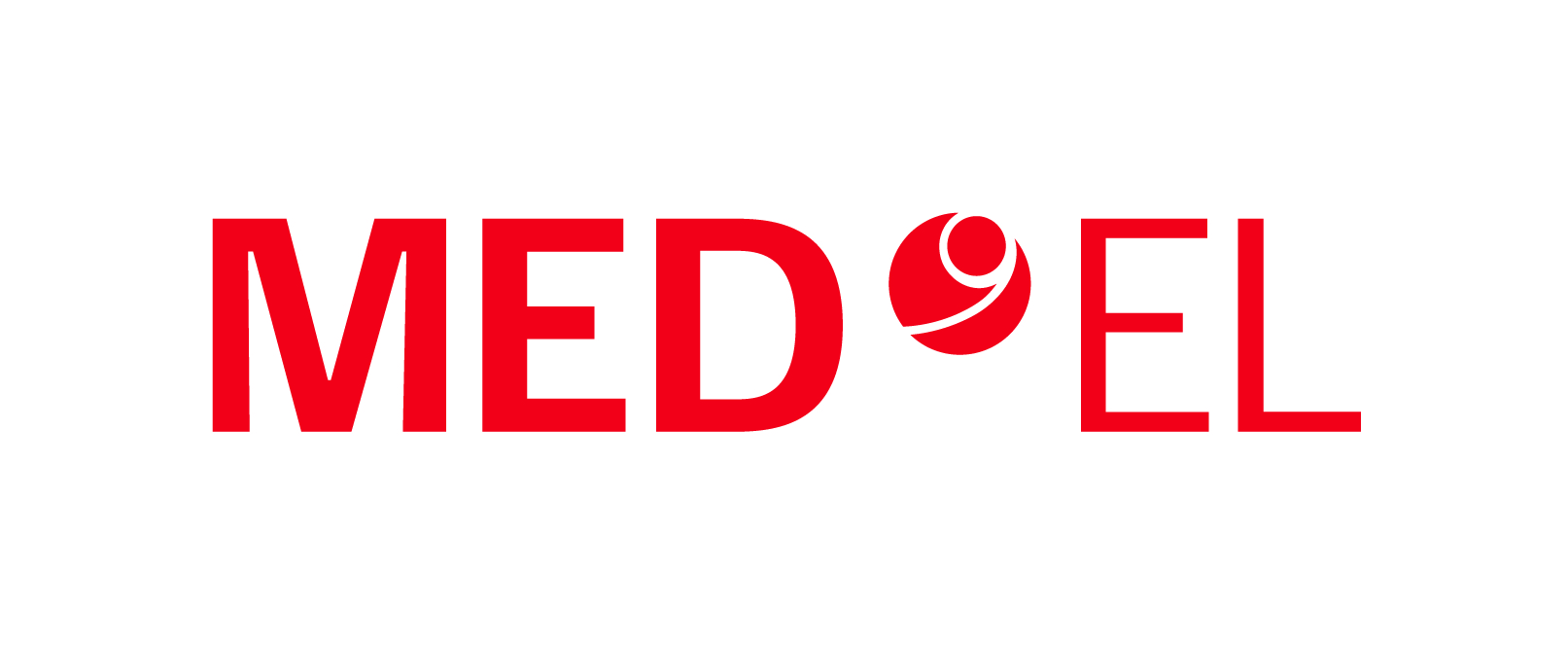
- Type: Private company
- Industry: medical device
- Founded: 1990
- Headquarters: Innsbruck, Austria
- Key people: Ingeborg Hochmair CEO & CTO
- Products: Hearing implants
- Number of employees: 3,300
- Website: www.medel.com

MED-EL is a global medical technology company specializing in hearing implants and devices. They develop and manufacture products including cochlear implants, middle ear implants and bone conduction systems.

MED-EL is a privately owned company and is run by its co-founder and CEO Ingeborg Hochmair, a scientist and researcher in the field of hearing implants. The company headquarters are in Innsbruck, Austria.

== History ==
In the mid-1970s, Ingeborg and Erwin Hochmair were research scientists at the Technical University of Vienna, working on the development of cochlear implants. In 1977, the first microelectronic multichannel cochlear implant was implanted by Dr Kurt Burian in Vienna.

Testing various sound processing strategies with this device, ranging from single-channel quasi-analog stimulation to more complex patterns, failed to produce open speech understanding. However, when a single broadband channel with analog-style stimulation was tried, the patient showed some rudimentary speech comprehension and lip-reading support. This finding changed the direction of their research program. The Hochmairs decided that their approach in making complex microelectronic implants was premature, and they pivoted to researching simpler passive implants that were easier to construct and modify.

In 1979, a passive transcutaneous four-channel implant developed by the Hochmairs allowed a woman to understand some open-set speech without lip-reading in a quiet environment. However, the speech coding strategy stimulated the best-performing single electrode rather than using multiple channels simultaneously, making this functionally closer to a single-channel approach.

=== 3M/Vienna single-channel cochlear implant ===
In 1981, the 3M Corporation entered into a licence and support agreement with the Vienna group involving the commercialisation of their cochlear implant system, and the device subsequently became known as the 3M/Vienna cochlear implant. Clinical evaluations demonstrated that some patients could achieve substantial open-set word recognition without visual cues. However, a redesign that replaced the intracochlear electrode with an extracochlear electrode resulted in diminished speech performance, and 3M's commercial involvement ultimately ended. Comparative studies found that, while the Vienna single-channel implant provided meaningful auditory benefit, multi-channel designs from other manufacturers generally allowed users to recognise more environmental sounds and understand speech more effectively in sound-only conditions. The Vienna group subsequently founded MED-EL in order to pursue a multi-channel design incorporating Blake Wilson's CIS-strategy.

In 1989, the Hochmair’s decided to create their own hearing implant company: MED-EL GmbH. As Erwin Hochmair had been awarded a professorship at the University of Innsbruck, they decided to found the company in the city and hired their first three employees in 1990. In 1991, they developed the world’s first behind-the-ear (BTE) audio processor. Instead of being attached to the body, this audio processor was worn behind the ear in the same way as a conventional hearing aid.

In 1995, MED-EL developed the CIS LINK system: an audio processor that allowed users of the Ineraid implant to use the recently developed CIS sound coding strategy, despite the fact that Ineraid had discontinued further development on their implants.

In 2003, the company acquired the Vibrant Soundbridge, a new type of active middle ear implant pioneered by American inventor Geoffrey Ball. It was MED-EL’s first non-cochlear implant product. Further non-cochlear implant products followed with the Bonebridge active bone conduction implant in 2012 and the Adhear non-surgical bone conduction system in 2017.

MED-EL operates in 140 countries worldwide including Europe, America, the Middle East, Asia and Australia. There are around 200,000 MED-EL users around the world.

The company opened its own hearing museum, the Audioversum Science Centre, in 2013. The science centre is located in central Innsbruck.

== Products ==
=== Cochlear Implants ===
These were the first products to be designed and manufactured by MED-EL. They electronically stimulate the cochlea, sending sound signals to auditory nerve and onto the brain. The current models available are the Synchrony 2 implant with either the Sonnet 3 or Rondo 3 audio processor. The Synchrony 2 implant can undergo MRI scans of up to 3.0 Tesla.

=== Electric acoustic stimulation ===
In 2005, MED-EL released their first electric acoustic stimulation system (EAS). This new type of implant combines both cochlear implant and hearing aid technology. The cochlear implant technology helps patients to hear high-pitched sounds, while the hearing aid technology helps them to hear low-pitched sounds. The current models are the Synchrony 2 for EAS implant with the Sonnet 3 EAS audio processor.

=== Middle ear implants ===
In 2003, MED-EL acquired the Vibrant Soundbridge, a new type of middle ear implant. The implant works by vibrating the bones of the middle ear, allowing sound vibrations to pass from the middle ear to the cochlea. The current models are the VORP 503 implant and the SAMBA 2 audio processor. Inventor Geoffrey Ball still works as a technical director at MED-EL. The company also offer passive middle ear implants — prostheses that replace one or all of the ossicles in the middle ear, again allowing sound vibrations to pass from the middle ear to the cochlea.

=== Bone conduction systems ===
MED-EL offers two types of bone conduction systems: an implant and a non-surgical device. The Bonebridge bone conduction implant was the first implant on the market to offer direct drive stimulation of the bone through a transcutaneous device. The current models are the BCI 602 implant and the SAMBA 2 audio processor. The system was first approved in Europe in 2012.

The Adhear bone conduction device is the company’s only non-surgical hearing device. It consists of an adhesive adapter, which is placed on the skin behind the ear. The hearing device then snaps onto the adapter and transmits sound vibrations to the bones of the skull. There is currently only one model of the Adhear available.

=== Auditory brainstem implant ===
MED-EL has been producing auditory brainstem implants since 1997. The ABI is similar in design to a cochlear implant, however the electrode array is placed on the cochlear nucleus of the brainstem, as opposed to being inserted into the cochlea.

== Research and development ==
=== Hearo ===
A collaboration with Swiss company CAScination helped to develop Hearo, a surgical robot designed to assist with cochlear implantation. It uses image-guided surgical planning software to plan the optimal trajectory to the cochlea. The Hearo received the CE mark in 2020.

=== Vestibular prosthesis ===
Vestibular dysfunction can lead to a multitude of balance problems, such as falls. MED-EL is conducting research into a viable vestibular prosthesis with local partners, including the Medical University of Innsbruck and the UMIT university in Hall. Investigational devices have already been implanted in patients in Europe and the US.

=== Dexel ===
MED-EL is developing the Dexel electrode array, which emits controlled doses of the drug dexamethasone into the cochlea to improve healing after implantation. The first six patients were implanted with the Dexel at the Hannover Medical School in Germany as part of a clinical trial in 2020.

=== Improved healing ===
The company is researching different ways to improve healing after cochlear implantation. In 2020, MED-EL and the Paracelsus Medical University Salzburg announced a joint research agreement for the clinical testing of human umbilical cord cell-derived extracellular vesicles. The first clinical trial will take place at the Hannover Medical School in Germany.

=== TICI ===
MED-EL is the first manufacturer to commercialise a totally implantable cochlear implant, it was unveiled on October 2026. This involves combining all the parts of the audio processor into the internal implant. The first patient in Europe was implanted with a TICI in September 2020 as part of a clinical trial.

== Awards ==
- 2021: Red Dot award for Rondo 3
- 2020: Innovator of the Year award for Synchrony cochlear implant system, Bonebridge bone conduction implant and AudioKey app
- 2020: Trigos award for international engagement, for healthcare projects in Bangladesh and Ivory Coast
- 2019: Red Dot award for Bonebridge BCI 602 implant
- 2014: Red Dot award for MED-EL audio processor
- 2013: Red Dot award for VSB QuickCheck
- 2004: Honorary Doctorate for Medicine (Ingeborg and Erwin Hochmair) from Technical University of Munich
