= Marguerite McDonald =

American eye surgeon

- Born: 1951 (age 74–75)
- Education: B.S., Manhattanville College of the Sacred Heart; M.D., Columbia University; LSU Eye Center
- Occupation: Ophthalmologist
- Known for: World's first photorefractive keratectomy (PRK) using excimer laser on a healthy eye of a living human (1988)

Marguerite B. McDonald, MD, FACS (born 1951) is an American eye surgeon and clinical professor of ophthalmology based in New York. She performed the world's first laser-vision correction procedure, a photorefractive keratectomy (PRK) using excimer laser, on a healthy eye of a living human patient, and pioneered several types of eye surgeries.

In 1987, McDonald performed the first excimer laser treatment to help patients with nearsightedness; in 1993 she became the first to use this treatment to treat farsightedness. In September 2003, she became the first person in North America to perform Epi-LASIK. She has also conducted the first wavefront-based laser surgeries in the United States. She was a co-developer of Kaufman-McDonald epikeratophakia, which is used to correct certain refractive errors.

== Early life and education ==
Marguerite McDonald was born in 1951. She grew up in Chicago, Illinois, and was exposed to a medical environment early in life. She spent time with her father, an orthopedic surgeon, while he was working at the hospital and when he was out visiting various football teams as the team physician. Her mother was a model.

As a very young child, McDonald had severe nearsightedness, first diagnosed at the age of five, after she fell into a lake and nearly drowned because she couldn't distinguish between green grass and the water which was green with algae. At the time, her family was told by their doctor that her vision impairment was so severe, she could go blind before reaching adulthood. Prescribed "Coke-bottle" glasses, when Marguerite put them on, she saw her mother's face in focus for the first time in her life and refused to take them off for weeks. Years later as a teenager, she finally became eligible for contact lens, and became determined to help people see without their glasses.

McDonald received a bachelor's degree in biology and studio art from Manhattanville College in Purchase, New York. In 1976, she earned her medical degree at Columbia University College of Physicians and Surgeons in New York City. She did her residency in ophthalmology at Manhattan Eye, Ear and Throat Hospital. Although her early clinical work focused on retinoblastoma, she decided her true interest was in the cornea.

McDonald moved to New Orleans to pursue additional training at the Louisiana State University Eye Center in 1980. In 1981, she completed her fellowship in corneal and external diseases with Dr. Herbert E. Kaufman at the Louisiana State University Eye Center, which was cut short by one year when she was hired as faculty.

== Career ==
In 1981, McDonald joined the faculty of the Louisiana State University School of Medicine. She went on to become a professor of ophthalmology, director of the corneal service, and chairman of promotions and tenure. She was involved in laboratory research on the cornea and co-edited The Cornea (1988) with H. E. Kaufman, B. A. Baron, and S. R. Waltman.

=== Kaufman McDonald epikeratophakia ===
In New Orleans, McDonald started research into refractive surgical procedures. During her fellowship at the LSU Eye Center, she worked with Kaufman in perfecting epikeratophakia, a technique using freeze-dried donor cornea shaped by precision machining, and grafting it onto the recipient's eye. It became known as the "KME procedure", which stood for Kaufman McDonald epikeratophakia.

Upon completing her training, McDonald gained experience in leading a clinical trial of epikeratophakia involving 700 surgeons in the United States and other countries, and in presenting data to the Food and Drug Administration. Although the procedure was performed widely for several years, it typically took patients 6 weeks for visual recovery, and was eventually superseded by other techniques.

=== Radial keratotomy study ===
McDonald was selected as one of nine surgeons involved in a landmark study, the prospective evaluation of radial keratotomy (PERK), taking the place of a senior colleague who decided to move. She was the youngest surgeon involved in the ten-year PERK study.

As part of the trial, McDonald became one of the first surgeons worldwide to perform a radial keratotomy, a surgical procedure to correct nearsightedness. The surgeries were performed in 1982 and 1983, with patients returning for ophthalmic examinations over a ten-year period to assess their safety and effectiveness.

=== Excimer laser treatments ===
In 1983, McDonald read an American Journal of Ophthalmology article by Stephen Trokel, one of her former professors at Columbia Medical School, exploring the possibility of using excimer laser technology in corneal surgery instead of a scalpel. Trokel, who had first seen the excimer laser used to make computer chips in Silicon Valley, had started experimenting on a few animal cadaver eyes from pigs and cows. McDonald immediately called Trokel and offered to help him develop the technique and provide access to the primate center that the LSU Eye Center was using. Trokel accepted her offer, and soon, he, McDonald, and Charles Munnerlyn began their collaboration with CooperVision, which later sold rights to the excimer laser to Munnerlyn's startup, Visx (now Johnson & Johnson Vision).

McDonald went on to lead a team that conducted extensive testing on cadaver eyes, living rabbits, and living monkeys, and eventually presented their results to the FDA. Initially, the results of the ablations they performed were poor, causing thick hyperplastic scarring in living rabbits and prompting members of the research team to quit because the project was too depressing. The research team eventually discovered that smoother ablations using an automated process instead of a hand crank yielded better outcomes.

On March 25, 1988, McDonald performed the world's first photorefractive keratectomy (PRK), laser-vision correction procedure, using excimer laser on a normal, sighted eye of a living human. (Note: Prior to that, she conducted extensive preclinical investigation and in June 1987, conducted a PRK on a blind eye.) The surgery was performed on Alberta Cassady, a 62-year-old woman who had cancer of the orbit, and offered her healthy eye for experimentation before it was removed. Following the PRK, the team examined Cassady daily and obtained her eye specimen 11 days later. According to McDonald, the unusual case helped to accelerate development of laser vision correction by months, or even years.

Although the initial results were promising, refractive surgery remained controversial in the ophthalmic community for many years, particularly when early reports began to show that there was a gradual hyperopic shift occurring in 50% of patients following radial keratotomy. Critics worried that refractive surgery was "frivolous" or even "unethical". McDonald herself was singled out by a prominent, well respected ophthalmologist who published a "vitriolic diatribe" against her and against refractive surgery in a leading ophthalmic academic journal.

Nevertheless, within ten years of McDonald's first PRK on a living patient, the excimer laser had emerged as a popular treatment for nearsightedness in the United States. In 1993, McDonald performed the first hyperopic PRK, applying the technique to treat farsightedness. In 1999, she performed the first wavefront-based treatment in the United States.

=== Clinical professorship and private practice ===
In 1994, McDonald established, and became director of, the Southern Vision Institute in New Orleans. In 2006, she joined the Ophthalmic Consultants of Long Island in Lynbrook, New York. As of 2009, she was performing both surface ablation and IntraLase LASIK in her private practice.

As of 2018, McDonald was also a clinical professor of ophthalmology at New York University and an adjunct clinical professor of ophthalmology at Tulane University Health Sciences Center in New Orleans. She was a staff physician at Manhattan Eye Ear and Throat Hospital, as well as several other eye centers including Mercy Medical Center in Rockville Centre, New York.

== National and international societies ==
McDonald was the first female president of both the American Society of Cataract and Refractive Surgery (ASCRS) and the International Society of Refractive Surgery (ISRS). She has served on many editorial boards for clinical and scientific journals, including Eye World.

== Accolades ==
McDonald's poster titled "Wavefront Technology Improves Vision by Reducing Aberrations in Progressive Lenses" was awarded the "Best Poster" award by the American Academy of Ophthalmology in 2010.

In 2010, McDonald became the first woman to receive the International Svyatoslav N. Fyodorov Award at the International Congress of the Hellenic Society of Intraocular Implant and Refractive Surgery.

In 2012 McDonald became the first person to receive the Visionary Woman Award from the group Ophthalmic Women Leaders, which she was one of the founders of (along with Tamara Church Swanson, who came up with the idea, and Jan Beiting).

== Personal life ==
In 1989, McDonald married Stephen Klyce, a professor of ophthalmology at LSU Eye Center. She has two stepsons and a stepdaughter. As of 2018, she was based in Port Washington, New York.

== Selected publications ==
McDonald has authored or co-authored over 1,000 publications on the cornea and refractive surgery.

- McDonald, Marguerite B.; Kaufman, H. E.; Frantz, J. M.; Shofner, S.; Salmeron, B.; Klyce, S. D. (May 1, 1989). "Excimer Laser Ablation Human Eye". Archives of Ophthalmology. 107 (5): 641–642. doi:10.1001/archopht.1989.01070010659013. ISSN 0003-9950. PMID 2719572.
- McDonald, Marguerite; Blondeau, Joseph M. (September 1, 2010). "Emerging antibiotic resistance in ocular infections and the role of fluoroquinolones". Journal of Cataract & Refractive Surgery. 36 (9): 1588–1598. doi:10.1016/j.jcrs.2010.06.028. ISSN 0886-3350. PMID 20692574. (Co-author)
- McDonald, Marguerite; Patel, Dipen A.; Keith, Michael S.; Snedecor, Sonya J. (April 1, 2016). "Economic and Humanistic Burden of Dry Eye Disease in Europe, North America, and Asia: A Systematic Literature Review". The Ocular Surface. 14 (2): 144–167. doi:10.1016/j.jtos.2015.11.002. ISSN 1542-0124. PMID 26733111.
- McDonald, Marguerite B.; Mychajlyszyn, Andrey; Mychajlyszyn, Daniel; Klyce, Stephen D. (June 2021). "Advances in Corneal Surgical and Pharmacological Approaches to the Treatment of Presbyopia". Journal of Refractive Surgery (Thorofare, N.J.: 1995). 37 (S1): S20–S27. doi:10.3928/1081597X-20210408-04. ISSN 1938-2391. PMID 34170764.
- Iwamoto, Yuri; Koh, Shizuka; Inoue, Ryota; Maeda, Naoyuki; McDonald, Marguerite; Nishida, Kohji (July 1, 2024). "What Happens 20 to 30 years After Radial Keratotomy? Case Series". Eye & Contact Lens. 50 (7): 329–331. doi:10.1097/ICL.0000000000001097. ISSN 1542-233X. PMID 38728248.
