= David Huang (ophthalmologist) =

Taiwanese ophthalmologist and inventor

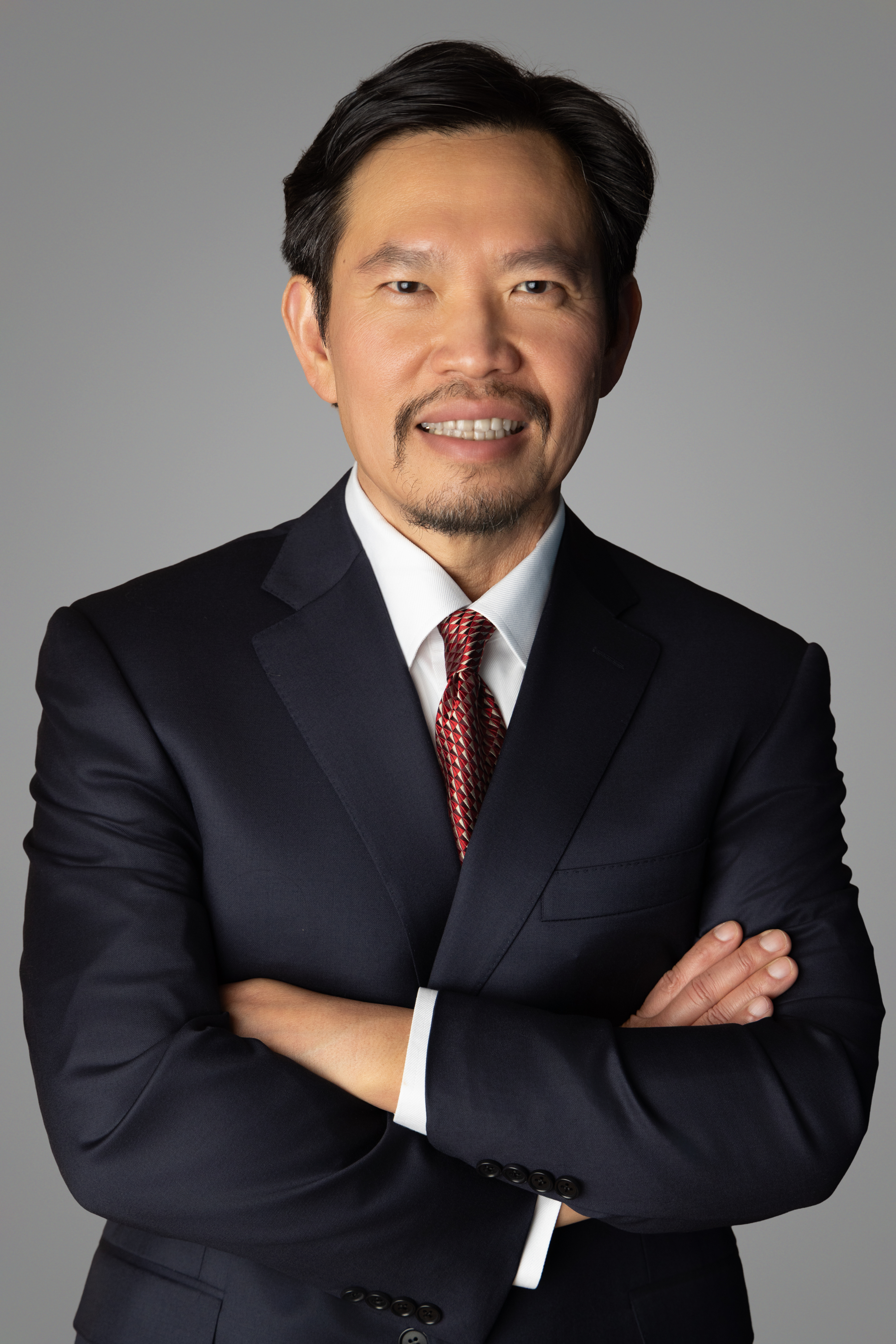
- Huang in 2025
- Born: 1964 (age 61–62)
- Education: B.S., M.S. MIT; M.D., Ph.D. Harvard–MIT HST
- Known for: Co‑inventing optical coherence tomography (OCT)
- Awards: National Medal of Technology and Innovation (2023); Member, National Academy of Engineering (2023); Member, National Academy of Medicine (2024); National Inventors Hall of Fame (2025)
- Scientific career
- Fields: Ophthalmology · Biomedical engineering
- Workplaces: Oregon Health & Science University

David Huang (born 1964) is a Taiwanese‑American ophthalmologist, biomedical engineer, and inventor best known for co‑inventing optical coherence tomography (OCT), an imaging modality used in ophthalmology and cardiology. He is a professor and researcher at Oregon Health & Science University, where he is the Wold Family Chair in Ophthalmic Imaging at the Casey Eye Institute.

== Early life and education ==
Huang was born in 1964, in Chiayi, Taiwan. Raised in rural Taiwan, he moved to the United States aged 12. His father Edwin was also a physician, while his mother was a teacher. He was valedictorian of his high school in Avoca, New York.

Huang studied electrical engineering and computer science at Massachusetts Institute of Technology (MIT), receiving a bachelor's degree in 1985. He then began an MD-PhD joint program at MIT and Harvard University, studying medical engineering and medical physics. As part of this program, he worked in the lab of James Fujimoto. In 1991, Huang, Fujimoto and electrical engineer Eric Swanson developed OCT. His dissertation, supervised by Fujimoto, was titled Optical Coherence Tomography and was published in 1993.

== Career ==
Working with ophthalmologists on clinical applications of OCT, Huang decided to pursue a career in ophthalmology. After completing his medical internship at Mercy Hospital in San Diego in 1994, he completed an ophthalmology residency at the University of Southern California (USC) Doheny Eye Institute from 1994 to 1997, followed by a cornea fellowship at Emory University. He then spent five years at the Cleveland Clinic, establishing a clinical practice in cornea and refractive surgery as well as a research program in OCT. He received a National Institutes of Health grant to study OCT applications for glaucoma in 2003. He returned to USC in 2004 to serve as Associate Professor of Ophthalmology and Biomedical Engineering, as well as the director of the Doheny Laser Vision Center.

Huang joined Oregon Health and Science University (OHSU) in 2010. He established the Center for Ophthalmic Optics & Lasers (COOL Lab), which is investigating expanded uses for OCT. In 2011, he co-founded Gobiquity, which produces a smartphone app called GoCheck Kids to assess preschoolers for risk of amblyopia. He launched a second startup focused on laser therapeutic devices and co-founded the International Ocular Circulation Society.

Huang is the Wold Family Chair in Ophthalmic Imaging and a professor of ophthalmology and biomedical engineering in the OHSU School of Medicine. He became the director of research and the associate director of the Casey Eye Institute in 2020.

== Optical coherence tomography ==
In 1991, Huang, Fujimoto, and Swanson, among other collaborators, invented optical coherence tomography (OCT), an imaging technique used for diagnosis of ocular and cardiac conditions. Publishing their findings in Science in 1993, they used interferometry and a data processing pipeline to detect the amplitude and time-of-flight of reflected light, creating multi-dimensional images. This technique supports early detection of macular degeneration, glaucoma and diabetic retinopathy, due to its micrometer depth resolution of fine subsurface structures and noninvasive methods. A profile in the New England Journal of Medicine described this technology as having "changed the modern eyeexamination"; as of 2023, 40 million such scans were performed annually. Huang researches the use of OCT technology in polarization-sensitive OCT, corneal and anterior segment OCT, Doppler OCT, OCT angiography, and OCT optoretinography.

Huang is an inventor and holds 44 U.S. patents in the areas of OCT, OCT angiography, laser therapeutics, tissue engineering, and smartphone eye screening. He has published over 350 articles in peer-reviewed scientific journals that have been cited over 75,000 times (H-index 108). He is a co-founder and president emeritus of the International Ocular Circulation Society

== Awards and honors ==
Huang was a co-recipient (along with Fujimoto and Swanson) of the 2017 Russ Prize, the 2022 National Medal of Technology and Innovation, and the 2023 Lasker-DeBakey Clinical Medical Research Award for his invention of OCT. He also received the 2013 Friedenwald Award from the Association for Research in Vision and Ophthalmology, as well as the António Champalimaud Vision Award and a Visionary Award from the Sanford and Susan Greenburg Prize to End Blindness.

Huang was elected to the National Academy of Engineering in 2023, the National Academy of Medicine in 2024, and the American Institute for Medical and Biological Engineering College of Fellows in 2026. He was named a Oregon History Maker by the Oregon Historical Society in 2024. He was inducted into the National Inventors Hall of Fame in 2025. Huang was named a 2026 Citation Laureate in Physiology or Medicine by Clarivate for co-inventing optical coherence tomography (OCT).
