= Robert L. White =

Robert L. White may refer to:

- Robert L. White (collector) (1949–2003), American collector of presidential memorabilia
- Robert L. White (engineer) (1927–2023), American electrical engineer and cochlear implant pioneer
- Rusty White (Robert L. White, born 1945), American founder of the Robb Report
