= Eric Swanson (engineer) =

American engineer (born 1960)

Eric A. Swanson FIEEE, Optica Fellow
- Born: September 16, 1960 (age 66); Quincy, Massachusetts, U.S.
- Education: University of Massachusetts Amherst; Massachusetts Institute of Technology
- Occupations: Electrical engineer; entrepreneur
- Known for: Optical coherence tomography (with Fujimoto and Huang)

Eric A. Swanson (born September 16, 1960) is an American electrical engineer and entrepreneur known for co-inventing optical coherence tomography.

== Career ==
Swanson was born in Quincy, Massachusetts, on September 16, 1960. His father was a professor of business and economics at the University of Alaska Fairbanks. Swanson graduated with a bachelor's degree from the University of Massachusetts Amherst in 1982 (Summa Cum Laude), followed by a master's degree from the Massachusetts Institute of Technology (MIT) in 1984.

In the late 1980s, while serving as associate group leader at MIT's Lincoln Laboratory, Swanson began collaborating with James Fujimoto and his student, David Huang. Together they developed the first Optical Coherence Tomography, a technique widely use in medicine that uses interference to reconstruct the 3D structure of an object or tissue. Their paper was published in Science in 1991.

Since 2004, Swanson has been a research affiliate at MIT. His previous roles include co-founder and chairman of Acacia Communications Inc. (2009-2018); co-founder and chief scientist of Sycamore Networks (1998-2004); co-founder and chief technology officer of LightLab Imaging (1998-2002); co-founder of Advanced Ophthalmic Devices (1992-1994); and associate group leader at MIT Lincoln Laboratory (1984-1998). Swanson is a fellow of the Institute of Electrical and Electronics Engineers and an Optica Fellow. As of January 2025, Swanson had 64 registered U.S. patents.

== Awards and honors ==
- Champalimaud Vision Award (2012)
- Lasker-DeBakey Clinical Medical Research Award (2023)
- National Medal of Technology and Innovation (2023)
- Induction to the National Inventors Hall of Fame (2025)
- IEEE Edison Medal (2026)
