= Radial keratotomy =

Refractive surgical procedure to correct myopia (nearsightedness

- Other names: RK
- ICD-9-CM: 11
- MeSH: D007646

Radial keratotomy (RK) is a refractive surgical procedure to correct myopia (nearsightedness). It was developed in 1974 by Svyatoslav Fyodorov, a Russian ophthalmologist. It has been almost entirely supplanted by newer, more accurate operations, such as photorefractive keratectomy, LASIK, Epi-LASIK and the phakic intraocular lens.

== Procedure ==
When performing RK, incisions are made with a diamond knife. The incisions relax the steep central cornea in patients with myopia in order to achieve a decreased need for correction. The original technique – consisting of incisions from periphery to center – was called the "Russian technique", while the later advances of performing controlled incision from center to periphery was called the "American technique". RK may be performed with different types, numbers, and patterns of incisions. Typically, between 4 and 24 radial incisions are made in a number of patterns and orientations based on refractive errors, surgeon style and surgeon training. RK with 8 incisions is most common.

Incisions that penetrate only the superficial corneal stroma are less effective than those reaching deep into the cornea, and consequently, incisions are made quite deep. One study cites incisions made to a depth equivalent to the thinnest of four corneal-thickness measurements made near the center of the cornea. Other sources cite surgeries leaving 20 to 50 micrometres of corneal tissue unincised (roughly equivalent to 90% of corneal depth, based on thickness norms).

== Results ==
The procedure results in a decrease in nearsightedness. According to the PERK study, 58% of eyes were corrected within 1.00D of goal 3 years after surgery. Additionally, 76% of eyes had uncorrected vision of 20/40 or better at 3 years. From 2 to 10 years post-operatively 43% of eyes had an increase in farsightedness by 1.00D or more. Despite this, 70% of patients reported not requiring corrective lenses for distance vision 10 years after surgery.

== Postsurgical healing ==
The healing corneal wounds consist of newly abutting corneal stroma, fibroblastic cells, and irregular fibrous connective tissue. Closer to the wound surface lies the epithelial plug, a bed of the cells that form the normal corneal epithelium which have fallen into the wound. Often this plug is three to four times as deep as the normal corneal epithelium layer. As the cells migrate from the depth of the plug up to the surface, some die before reaching it, forming breaches in the otherwise healthy epithelial layer. This, consequently, leaves the cornea more susceptible to infections. The risk is estimated to be between 0.25% and 0.7% Healing of the RK incisions is very slow and unpredictable, often incomplete even years after surgery. Similarly, infection of these chronic wounds can also occur years after surgery, with 53% of ocular infections being late in onset.

== Complications ==
- Visual phenomenon: Large epithelial plugs may cause more scattering of light, leading to the appearance of visual phenomena such as flares and starbursts – especially in situations such as night driving, where the stark light of car headlights abounds. These dark conditions cause the pupil to dilate, maximizing the amount of scattered light that enters the eye. In cases where large epithelial plugs lead to such aggravating symptoms, patients may seek further surgical treatment to alleviate the symptoms.
- Progressive hyperopia (farsightedness): RK enjoyed great popularity during the 1980s, and was one of the most studied refractive surgical procedures. Its 10-year data was published as the PERK (Prospective Evaluation of Radial Keratotomy) study, which proved the onset of progressive hyperopia – often found a decade after the original surgery – is due to continued flattening of the central cornea.
- Infectious keratitis: There is a risk of corneal infection after RK. Approximately half of infections occur within 2 weeks of surgery, but delayed infection do occur up to a year after surgery. Staphylococcus aureus was the most commonly identified bacteria for rapid onset and Pseudomonas aeruginosa was the most common identified bacteria for delayed onset.
- Refractive changes at high altitude: Changes in refractive power of post RK corneas at high altitude has been well documented. There is a significant increase in the cycloplegic refraction as well as corneal thickness measurements in RK corneas exposed to high altitude. This was famously experienced by mountaineer Beck Weathers (who had undergone RK) during the 1996 Mount Everest disaster.
- Diurnal fluctuation: in a majority of patients who have undergone RK the cornea will steepen throughout the day. This can lead to variation in visual quality throughout the day.

== Visual rehabilitation and cataract surgery after RK ==
The PERK study demonstrated that people who undergo RK continue to drift toward hyperopia ("farsightedness"). Additionally, many of these people have reached the age where presbyopia occurs. Some also develop cataracts. Their vision can still be restored with Epi-LASIK, photorefractive keratectomy, LASIK or phakic lens extraction, or cataract surgery. The corneal curvature has to remeasured and modified by history, central keratometry, or contact lens method.

Selecting intraocular lenses for cataract surgery in patients who have undergone any refractive surgery has proven challenging and is associated with decreased accuracy in lens selection. RK is associated with increased inaccuracy compared to other refractive procedures such as LASIK and PRK. This is due to difficulty measuring the corneal curvature of post-RK corneas as well as difficulty identifying an effective lens position using standard lens calculations. Additional methods have been introduced to improve the accuracy of IOL calculations.

Multifocal IOL insertion in eyes that have undergone RK have not been associated with good outcomes and are generally not recommended.

== History ==
Beginning in 1936, Japanese ophthalmologist Tsutomu Sato conducted research in anterior and posterior keratotomy, an early form of refractive surgery that attempted to treat keratoconus, myopia and astigmatism by making incisions in the cornea. Enhanced flattening was noted with longer and deeper incisions. At first successful, Sato's technique resulted in bullous keratopathy in up to 70% of patients related to endothelial damage.

In 1974, Svyatoslav Fyodorov removed glass from the eye of a boy who had been in an accident. The boy, who required eyeglasses for correction of myopia caused by astigmatism, fell off his bicycle. His glasses shattered on impact, and glass particles lodged in both eyes. To save the boy's vision, Fyodorov performed an operation which consisted of making numerous radial incisions extending from the pupil to the periphery of the cornea in a radial pattern like the spokes of a wheel. After the glass was removed by this method and the cornea healed, Fyodorov found that the boy's visual acuity had improved significantly.

In 1989, about 30,000 RK surgeries were being done per year in the U.S. In 1994, this increased to approximately 250,000. In 1995, the first laser for PRK was FDA approved in the U.S., making RK obsolete.
