= Rangaswamy Srinivasan =

Chemist and inventor (born 1929)

- Born: 28 February 1929 (age 97); Madras, Madras Presidency, British India (now Chennai, Tamil Nadu, India)
- Education: University of Madras, University of Southern California
- Known for: Ablative Photodecomposition, LASIK
- Awards: Russ Prize (2011); National Medal of Technology and Innovation (2012)
- Scientific career
- Fields: Physical chemistry
- Workplaces: IBM Research

Rangaswamy Srinivasan (born February 28, 1929, in Madras, India) is a physical chemist and inventor with a 30-year career at IBM Research. He has developed techniques for ablative photodecomposition and used them to contribute to the development of LASIK eye surgery.

He received the National Medal of Technology from President Obama on February 2, 2013, for his contributions to laser eye surgery.

== Education ==
Srinivasan was born in present-day Chennai, Tamil Nadu, India on 28 February 1929. Srinivasan received both bachelor's and master's degrees in science from the University of Madras, in 1949 and 1950. In 1953 he moved to the United States to attend graduate school. He earned a doctorate in physical chemistry at the University of Southern California in 1956, studying protein chemistry with chemical kineticist Sidney W. Benson. He held postdoctoral positions at the California Institute of Technology in 1956, and at the University of Rochester from 1957 to 1961.

== Career ==
Srinivasan has spent a thirty-year career, from 1961 to 1990, at IBM's T. J. Watson Research Center in Yorktown Heights, New York. He joined the research staff in 1961, and was promoted to "manager of fundamental photochemical research" in 1963. His research group has studied ultraviolet light and its effects on organic matter.

In 1981, Srinivasan and his coworkers determined that an ultraviolet excimer laser could be used to etch designs into polymers. The technique has since been used in the computer industry to drill polymers to create computer circuit boards and ink jet printer nozzles.

Srinivasan, physicist James J. Wynne and materials scientist Samuel Blum speculated that it might also be possible to use excimer lasers on living tissue. On November 27, 1981, Srinivasan experimented with the remains of his family's Thanksgiving turkey, and proved that it was possible to create precisely-etched patterns. An ultraviolet excimer laser pulsed at 193 nm was able to etch living tissue precisely without causing any thermal damage to surrounding area. Srinivasan named the technique Ablative Photodecomposition (APD), a type of Laser ablation.

In 1983, ophthalmic surgeon Stephen Trokel approached Srinivasan about the possibility of using APD for surgery of the cornea. The collaboration of Srinivasan, Trokel, and Bodil Braren led to development of LASIK eye surgery, a technique for reshaping the cornea to correct visual issues such as myopia, hyperopia and astigmatism. In 1995, a commercial system for laser refractive surgery was approved by the U.S. Food and Drug Administration.

Srinivasan has published over 130 scientific papers and holds at least 22 US patents. A patent application filed by Stephen Trokel in 1992, claiming a LASIK surgery technique as his sole invention, was declared invalid in 2000 by an International Trade Commission ruling that found that Srinivasan should have been included as a co-author.

In 1990, Srinivasan formed a consulting company, UVTech Associates.

== Awards ==
External videos
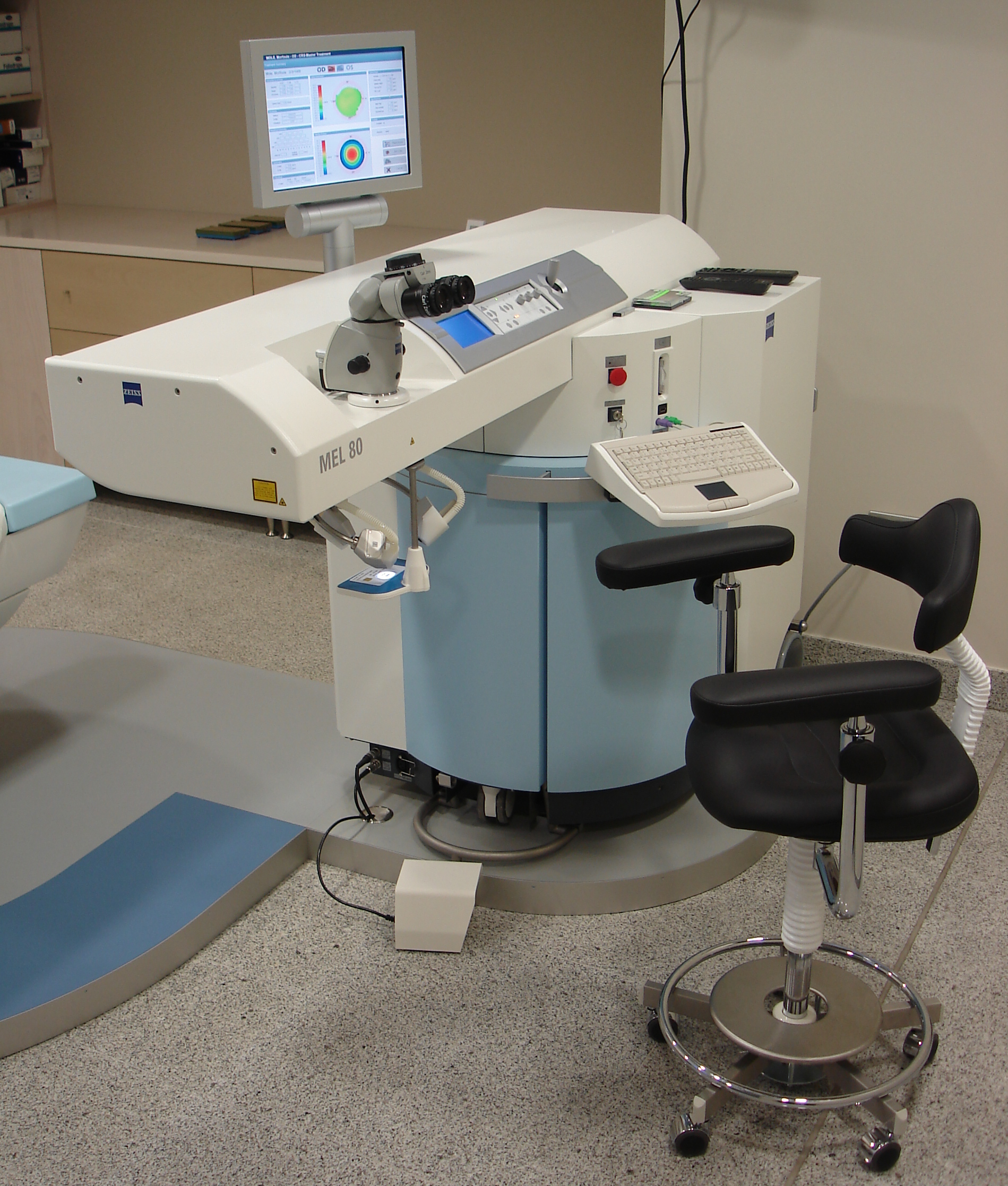
- 2013 Russ Prize, Ohio University

In 1997, Srinivasan was awarded the American Chemical Society's Award for Creative Invention, and the ACS North East Section's Esselen Medal.

In 1998, Srinivasan was awarded the Max Delbruck Prize in Biological Physics by the American Physical Society.

In 1999, he was elected a member of the National Academy of Engineering.

In 2002, he was inducted into the US National Inventors Hall of Fame.

In 2004, he received the Prize for Industrial Applications of Physics from the American Institute of Physics. The same year, he, with Wynne and Blum, received the Optical Society's R. W. Wood Prize, "for their discovery of pulsed ultraviolet laser surgery, wherein laser light cuts and etches biological tissue by photoablation with minimal collateral damage, leading to healing without significant scarring."

In 2011, Srinivasan, Wynne, and Blum received the Fritz J. and Dolores H. Russ Prize from Ohio University and the National Academy of Engineering (NAE) for their work, "a bioengineering achievement that significantly improves the human condition."

In 2012, Srinivasan, Wynne, and Blum were named as recipients of the National Medal of Technology and Innovation. The award was presented on February 1, 2013, by President Barack Obama, to acknowledge their work with the Excimer laser, leading to the development of LASIK Surgery.
