= Ingeborg Hochmair =

Austrian electrical engineer

Ingeborg J. Hochmair-Desoyer
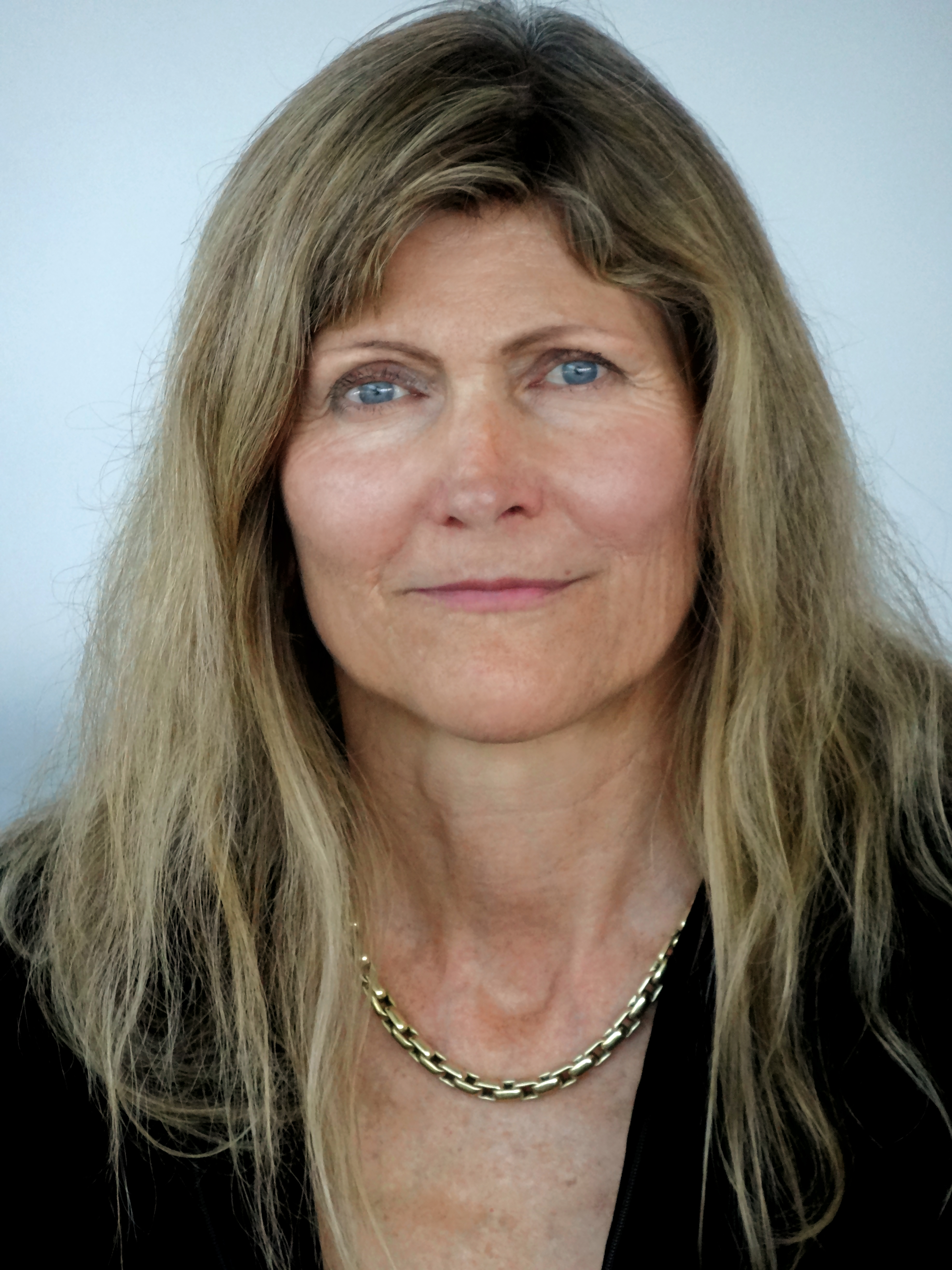
- Born: 1953 (age 72–73); Vienna, Austria
- Occupation: MED-EL
- Spouse: Erwin Hochmair
- Awards: Lasker-DeBakey Clinical Medical Research Award (2013)
- Scientific career
- Fields: Electrical engineering
- Workplaces: MED-EL

Ingeborg J. Hochmair-Desoyer (born 1953) is an Austrian electrical engineer and the CEO and CTO of hearing implant company MED-EL. Dr Hochmair and her husband Prof. Erwin Hochmair co-created the first micro-electronic multi-channel cochlear implant in the world. She received the Lasker-DeBakey Clinical Medical Research Award for her contributions towards the development of the modern cochlear implant. She also received the 2015 Russ Prize for bioengineering.

In 1989, she co-founded the medical device company MED-EL.

== Biography ==
Ingeborg Hochmair was born in 1953 in Vienna, Austria. Her mother was a physicist and her father was dean of the faculty of mechanical engineering at Vienna University of Technology. Her grandmother was one of the first female chemical engineers in Austria.

She commenced her studies at Technical University of Vienna in electrical engineering in 1971, and in 1975, she became the first woman in Austria to receive a PhD in electrical engineering. Her dissertation was on the "Technical realization and psychoacoustic evaluation of a system for multichannel chronic stimulation of the auditory nerve."

From 1976 to 1986, she worked as assistant professor at the Institute of General Electrical Engineering and Electronics at Technical University of Vienna. She also worked at Stanford University's Institute for Electronics in Medicine as a Visiting Associate Professor in 1979. In 1986, she moved from Vienna to Innsbruck, where she taught (first as Assistant Professor and later as associate professor) at the Institute of Applied Physics Electronics of University of Innsbruck until 1989. In 1998 she achieved Venia Legendi (Univ. Doz.) in biomedical engineering at the faculty of electrical engineering of Technical University of Vienna.

In 1989, Hochmair co-founded the hearing implant company MED-EL, along with husband Erwin Hochmair. She remains CEO and CTO of the company.

Outside of MED-EL, Hochmair continues to support research in the field of science and technology. In 2012, an endowed professorship in microelectronics and implantable systems was introduced at the University of Innsbruck's Institute for Mechatronics, supported by Hochmair. The University of Innsbruck also offers Ingeborg Hochmair Professorships, an endowed professorship aimed at supporting female researchers in science and technology.

== Research & Other Work ==
In 1975, Ingeborg and Erwin Hochmair started the cochlear implant development at Technical University of Vienna with the overall goal of enabling the user not only to hear sounds but also to provide some speech understanding. Together they developed the world's first microelectronic multi-channel cochlear implant. This implant included a long, flexible electrode, which could, for the first time, deliver electric signals to the auditory nerve along a large part of the cochlea, the snail-shaped inner ear. The new multi-channel device was implanted in December 1977 in Vienna by Dr Kurt Burian.

Testing various sound processing strategies with this device, ranging from single-channel quasi-analog stimulation to more complex patterns, failed to produce open speech understanding. However, when a single broadband channel with analog-style stimulation was tried, the patient showed some rudimentary speech comprehension and lip-reading support. This finding changed the direction of their research program. The Hochmairs decided that their approach in making complex microelectronic implants was premature, and they pivoted to researching simpler passive implants that were easier to construct and modify.

In 1979, a passive transcutaneous four-channel implant developed by the Hochmairs allowed a woman to understand some open-set speech without lip-reading in a quiet environment. However, the speech coding strategy stimulated the best-performing single electrode rather than using multiple channels simultaneously, making this functionally closer to a single-channel approach..

=== 3M/Vienna single-channel cochlear implant ===
In 1981, the 3M Corporation entered into a licence and support agreement with the Vienna group involving the commercialisation of their cochlear implant system, and the device subsequently became known as the 3M/Vienna cochlear implant. Clinical evaluations demonstrated that some patients could achieve substantial open-set word recognition without visual cues. However, a redesign that replaced the intracochlear electrode with an extracochlear electrode resulted in diminished speech performance, and 3M's commercial involvement ultimately ended. Comparative studies found that, while the Vienna single-channel implant provided meaningful auditory benefit, multi-channel designs from other manufacturers generally allowed users to recognise more environmental sounds and understand speech more effectively in sound-only conditions. The Vienna group subsequently founded MED-EL in 1990 in order to pursue a multi-channel design incorporating Blake Wilson's CIS-strategy.

Through MED-EL, Hochmair has led many further advances in hearing implant research, including the introduction of a behind-the-ear audio processor in 1991, new sound coding strategies, and the development of single-unit audio processors. A totally implantable cochlear implant has been released in September 2026.

The cochlear implant is the first device to actually replace a human sense Not only that, but it addresses hearing loss, which is number six on the list of the world's most significant disease burdens

Hochmair has over 40 patents to her name, all of which are for components of her cochlear implant. Many of the patents were updated or improved versions of older components for which she filed a new patent. A fairly comprehensive, but incomplete, list of her patents are as follows:

- 1999 Structure, method of use, and method of manufacture of an implanted hearing prosthesis
- 1999 Device and method for implants in ossified cochleas
- 2003 Implantable fluid delivery apparatuses and implantable electrode
- 2003 Implantable device with flexible interconnect to coil
- 2006 Implantable fluid delivery apparatuses and implantable electrode
- 2006 Implantable fluid [housing] apparatuses and implantable electrode
- 2007 Tinnitus Suppressing Cochlear Implant
- 2007 Implanted system with dc free inputs and outputs
- 2008 Cochlear Implant Power System and Methodology
- 2008 Moving Coil Actuator For Middle Ear Implants
- 2008 Implant Sensor and Control
- 2009 Demagnetized Implant for Magnetic Resonance Imaging
- 2009 Implantable device with flexible interconnect to coil
- 2009 Demagnetized implant for magnetic resonance imaging
- 2010 Low power signal transmission
- 2010 Low Power Signal Transmission (part 2)
- 2010 Tinnitus Suppressing Cochlear Implant (updated)
- 2010 Moving coil actuator for middle ear implants
- 2010 Implantable fluid delivery apparatuses and implantable electrode (part 2)
- 2011 Implantable Fluid Delivery Apparatuses and Implantable Electrode (part 3)
- 2011 Implanted system with DC free inputs and outputs
- 2013 Low power signal transmission (part 3)
- 2013 Low power signal transmission (update 4)
- 2013 Implant sensor and control
- 2014 Implant sensor and control
- 2015 Implantable Fluid Delivery Apparatus and Implantable Electrode (part 4)
- 2015 Cochlear Implant Electrode Insertion Support Device
- 2015 Deployable and Multi-Sectional Hearing Implant Electrode
- 2015 Deployable and Multi-Sectional Hearing Implant Electrode
- 2016 Implantable Fluid Delivery Apparatus and Implantable Electrode
- 2016 Implantable fluid delivery apparatus with micro-valve
- 2017 Implantable fluid delivery apparatus and implantable electrode (part 5)
- 2017 Implantable Fluid Delivery Apparatus and Implantable Electrode (part 6)
- 2019 Implantable fluid delivery apparatus and implantable electrode (part 7)
- 2020 MRI-Safe and Force-Optimized Implantable Ring Magnet System with an Enhanced Inductive Link
- 2022 MRI-Safe and Force-Optimized Implantable Ring Magnet System with an Enhanced Inductive Link (part 2)

Though she had a number of collaborators, Hochmair contributed to all 36 of these patents in major ways, as the cochlear implant project was hers. As can be seen in the patent timeline above, she has continued to update and improve her device even this year. More than 400,000 people around the world were already using this device as of 2015.

== Publications ==
Ingeborg Hochmair has over 100 scientific publications in the field of Cochlear Implants, Medical Devices, Neuroprotheses, Audio & Speech Processing Technology. Among the most important ones are the following:

- with E. Hochmair: Implantable eight-channel stimulator for the deaf. In: Proc. European Solid State Circuits Conf. (ESSCIRC) 77. Ulm, BRD Sept. 1977, S. 87–89.
- Verfahren zur elektrischen Stimulation des Hörnervs und Multikanal Hörprothese zur Durchführung des Verfahrens, (1978).
- Multifrequency system and method for enhancing auditory stimulation and the like, (1979).
- with E. S. Hochmair: Design and fabrication of multi-wire scala tympani electrodes. In: Annals of the New York Academy of Science. Band 405, 1983, S. 173–182.
- Technische Realisierung und psychoakustische Evaluation eines Systems zur chronischen Mehrkanalstimulation des Nervus acusticus. Dissertation. TU Vienna, 1981, ISBN 3-85369-491-8.
- with E. S. Hochmair und K. Burian: Four years of experience with cochlear prostheses (invited). In: Med. Prog. Technol. 8, 1981, S. 107–119.
- with E. S. Hochmair und H. K. Stiglbrunner: Psychoacoustic temporal processing and speech understanding in cochlear implant patients. In: R. A. Schindler, M. M. Merzenich: Cochlear Implant. Raven Press, New York, 1985, ISBN 0-88167-076-6, S. 291–304/.
- with C. Zierhofer und E. S. Hochmair: New hardware for analog and combined-analog-and-pulsatile sound-encoding strategies. In: Progress in Brain Research. Vol. 97, Elsevier Science Publishers, 1993, S. 291–300.
- with W. Arnold, P. Nopp, C. Jolly, J. Müller und P. Roland: Deep electrode insertion in Cochlear implants: Apical Morphology, electrodes and speech perception results. In: Acta Otolaryngol. 123 (5), 2003, S. 612–617.
- with P. Nopp und C. Jolly u. a.: MED-EL Cochlear implants: State of the art and a glimpse into the future. In: Trends in Amplification. 10(4), Dez 2006, S. 201–219.
- The importance of being flexible. In: Nat Med. 19 (10), Okt 2013, S. 1240–1244.

== Awards and honours ==
- 1977 Best Paper Award, European Solid State Circuits Conference, Ulm, BRD
- 1981 Technological Excellence Award, 2nd Place, Tech Ex 81, Vienna – Atlanta
- 1981 Holzer Prize, Technical University of Vienna
- 1980 Premio Leonardo da Vinci Award
- 1984 Sandoz Prize, Vienna
- 1995 Business Woman of the Year Award (Prix Veuve Clicquot)
- 1996 Wilhelm Exner Medal
- 2004 Honorary Doctorate in Medicine, Technical University of Munich
- 2008 Medal of Honour, State of Tyrol
- 2010 Honorary Doctorate, Medical University of Innsbruck
- 2011 Cross of Merit, City of Innsbruck
- 2012 Honorary Membership of the German Audiological Society (DGA)
- 2013 Honorary Senator of the University of Innsbruck
- 2013 Lasker-DeBakey Clinical Medical Research Award, New York, USA
- 2014 Ludwig Wittgenstein Prize, Austrian Research Foundation
- 2015 Fritz J. and Dolores H. Russ Prize, US National Academy of Engineering
- 2015 Ring of Honour, State of Tyrol
- 2015 Johann Joseph Ritter von Prechtl Medal, Technical University of Vienna
- 2016 Business Advisor, Tyrolean Chamber of Commerce
- 2016 Technology Prize, Eduard Rhein Foundation Munich
- 2017 Ring of Honour, District of Garbsen
- 2018 Honorary Member of the Austrian Academy of Sciences
- 2018 Shambaugh Prize, Corlas
- 2018 Honorary Doctorate, University of Bern
- 2020 Honorary Doctorate, University of Uppsala
- 2021 Honorary Doctorate in Science, University of Innsbruck
- 2026 Queen Elizabeth Prize for Engineering

== Personal life ==
Hochmair is married to her husband and business partner, Erwin Hochmair. The couple have four children.
