= Tsutomu Sato (ophthalmologist) =

Japanese ophthalmologist

Tsutomu Sato (1902 – June 9, 1960) was a Japanese ophthalmologist who performed an early version of the radial keratotomy and was the first professor at the Research Institute of Ophthalmology at Juntendo University School of Medicine.

== Biography ==
Sato was the first professor at the Research Institute of Ophthalmology at Juntendo University School of Medicine, where he researched the treatment of eye conditions such as trachoma and myopia.

In the mid-1930s, Sato devised a glass scleral lens, but it never came into wide usage. Within a few years, higher-quality glass scleral lenses from Carl Zeiss were available in Japan. In 1939, Sato became the first physician to report the use of radial keratotomy for myopia. Sato knew that the cornea flattened out in patients with keratoconus who suffered corneal hydrops from the leakage of fluid through Descemet's membrane. His idea was to create numerous breaks in that membrane through anterior and posterior approaches. His initial patients were military pilots.

Sato stopped performing his procedure because of the increasing availability of contact lenses in the late 1950s. In the years after Sato's version of the procedure was stopped, many patients experienced corneal decompensation and bullous keratopathy. When the Sato procedure was developed, there was no awareness of the importance of a layer of eye cells known as the corneal endothelium. By making incisions into both the front and back of the eye during the Sato procedure, surgeons were unknowingly disrupting the corneal endothelium, which would lead to corneal complications years later. When Svyatoslav Fyodorov took up the procedure in the Soviet Union, he avoided these complications by making his incisions only from the front side of the eye.

In 2003, the experiences of Japanese citizens with the Sato procedure were cited as still being a factor in the country's low rate of refractive surgery. About 48,000 refractive procedures were carried out that year in Japan, compared to 1.4 million procedures in the United States over the same period.
