= Epi-LASIK =

Refractive surgery technique

Epi-LASIK is a refractive surgery technique designed to reduce a person's dependency on eyeglasses and contact lenses. Invented by Dr. Ioannis Pallikaris, the technique is basically an automatic LASEK without alcohol; it can be better considered as superficial LASIK. The stromal bed is smoother than that obtained by mechanical methods or brush. Unlike alcohol (LASEK), there is no chance of damaging the limbal stem cells. It is also relatively less painful than LASEK.

1. A device similar to a microkeratome (called epi-keratome) slides over the surface of the cornea, just underneath the epithelial layer of cells while suction is applied.
2. The result is a hinged sheet of epithelium that is at least partially viable.
3. It is reflected out of the way so that the ablation can take place.
4. The sheet is repositioned and a bandage soft contact lens is placed on the eye.

Recent studies show that the surface epithelial layer of the cornea heals faster if the epithelial sheet is removed at the end of surgery. This means that the original rationale for carefully cleaving the epithelium with the aim of replacing it at the end of surgery is flawed. It is better in fact to discard the epithelial layer at the end of surgery, thus making epi-LASIK no different from traditional photorefractive keratectomy surgery.

== Advantages ==
1. Less damage to corneal nerves, hence safer in dry eyes
2. If cornea is abnormal for LASIK, epilasik may still be an option

== Complications ==
Although relatively uncommon, the following are some of the more frequently reported complications of Epi-LASIK:

- Slower or delayed epithelial healing
- Duplication of epithelium
- Over/undercorrection
- Visual acuity fluctuation
- Halos around light sources
- Starbursts around light sources
- Decentered ablation
- Corneal Haze
- Epithelium erosion
- Loss of epithelial flap

A potentially serious complication which occurs in 0.33% to 2.2% of cases is corneal stromal incursion during the microkeratome pass. When this happens, the blade inadvertently cuts into the collagenous corneal stroma and creates an irregularity. If this irregularity is near the visual axis, permanent visual blurring can occur.

== History ==
The first cases outside Greece were performed in 2003. In September 2003, Marguerite McDonald became the first person in North America to perform Epi-LASIK.
