= Robert L. White (engineer) =

Robert L. White (1927 – December 10, 2023) was an American professor of electrical engineering, and cochlear implant pioneer.

After becoming an expert in magnetics and a professor at Stanford, White switched to working on cochlear implants. In 1964, he and surgeon Blair Simmons made a six-electrode device directly implanted into the auditory nerve in the modiolus, as opposed to the more modern approach through the scalae of the cochlea. He continued to work with Simmons for decades on developing multi-channel implants of various sorts, and testing them with human subjects.
