= Thomas Zimmerman =

American journalist

Thomas C. Zimmerman
- Born: January 23, 1838; Lebanon County, Pennsylvania, U.S.
- Died: November 14, 1914 (aged 76); Reading, Berks County, Pennsylvania, U.S.
- Occupations: Writer, translator and newspaper editor

Thomas Cadwallader Zimmerman (January 23, 1838 – November 13, 1914) was a Pennsylvania German writer and translator, notable for his translations of English language classics into the Pennsylvania German dialect. He was also the editor of the Reading Times newspaper in Reading, Berks County, Pennsylvania.

== Life and career ==
Zimmerman was born in Lebanon County, Pennsylvania in 1838. There he attended public school until he was thirteen years old, and was apprenticed as a printer with the Lebanon Courier. Upon completion of his apprenticeship, he went to Philadelphia to work at The Philadelphia Inquirer. In 1856, he became a journeyman printer with the Berks and Schuylkill Journal. He relocated to Columbia, South Carolina in 1859, and returned to the Reading area at the outset of the American Civil War, where in 1863 he enlisted in Company C of the 42nd Regiment of Pennsylvania Volunteers. Although he is sometimes referred to as "Colonel," he saw no active service during the war. On June 11, 1867, he married Tamsie T. Kauffman of Reading. By 1897, he was the president of the Reading Times Publishing Company and editor of the Reading Times newspaper. In 1903, a volume titled Olla Podrida was published of his translations. In 1904, he was awarded a Doctor of Humane Letters degree from Muhlenberg College in Allentown, Pennsylvania. Zimmerman retired from his newspaper career in October, 1908.

Zimmerman was quite active in public life. He was trustee of the Board of the State Asylum at Wernersville, director of the Reading Free Public Library, president of the Pennsylvania Association of Superintendents and Trustees of Insane Asylums and vice-president of the Pennsylvania Chautauqua Association. He was one of the founders of the Pennsylvania German Society, and of the Historical Society of Berks County.

Zimmerman died in Reading, Pennsylvania in 1914.

== Translations ==
Zimmerman specialized in the translation of German poetry into English and of English language classics into the Pennsylvania German dialect, which, during his lifetime, was spoken by a significant percentage of the population in the area where he lived and worked. Because of his association with the Reading Times, in which his translations were regularly published, he was able to reach a large number of readers in the Berks County region.

His most notable translations included Clement C. Moores' "Twas the Night Before Christmas", Martin Luther's "Ein feste Burg ist unser Gott" ("A Mighty Fortress Is Our God)" and Friedrich Schiller's "Die Glocke" ("Song of the Bell").

== Publications ==
- The caverns of Luray (1881)
- Schiller's "The song of the bell"; and other poems (1896)
- Lebanon: a bit of retrospect, reminiscence and sentiment (1898)
- In memoriam: the Hon. Daniel Ermentrout: Historical Sketch Delivered before the Historical Society of Berks County, Pa., November 14, 1899
- Olla Podrida (1903)
- The Pennsylvania German as a Formative Influence in the Upbuilding of Our Commonwealth and in the Development of Eastern Pennsylvania (1939 reprint)
