= Totally implantable cochlear implant =

Prototype of cochlear implant

A totally implantable cochlear implant (TICI) is a fully implantable variant of the cochlear implant that is currently available on the European market from MED-EL. Unlike a conventional cochlear implant, which has both an internal component (the implant) and an external component (the audio processor), all the components of the TICI - including the microphone (or piezoelectric transducer) and battery - are implanted under the skin. This makes the TICI completely invisible from the outside.

As of March 2026, three medical device companies have tested totally implantable cochlear implants: Cochlear Limited, Envoy Medical Corporation, and MED-EL.

On 29th of September, 2026, MED-EL was the first company which launched TICI UNICO, the first totally implantable cochlear implant in the world, on European market.

== Cochlear Limited ==
The first totally implantable cochlear implant was tested in a pilot study of 3 adult participants beginning in 2005. The study was conducted by Cochlear Limited in collaboration with the Cooperative Research Centre for Cochlear Implant and Hearing Aid Innovation in Melbourne, Australia.

On the basis of the learnings from this study, the design of the totally implantable device was modified and another study was conducted on 10 adult participants between September 2018 and March 2020. A pivotal clinical trial for the device has been listed on clinicaltrials.gov.

== Envoy Medical ==
Three adult patients were implanted with the Acclaim® fully implanted cochlear implant as part of an early feasibility study in 2024. A pivotal clinical trial aimed at gaining FDA approval for the device began recruiting participants in late 2025.

== MED-EL ==
The MED-EL TICI has finished the clinical feasibility study stage of development, and is available in Europe from 29/09/2026. The first patient in Europe was implanted with a MED-EL TICI in September 2020 as part of a clinical trial. On 29th of September, 2026, MED-EL launches TICI UNICO, the first totally implantable cochlear implant in the world, on European market.

== Parts ==
The TICI contains the same internal components as a conventional cochlear implant: the magnet, antenna coil, electronics and the electrode array, however will also include the features of an audio processor including an implanted rechargeable battery and microphone. The TICI components may be integrated into a single case, the so-called monobody design, or the various components may be attached to one another by connectors, thereby allowing replacement of each of the several modules in case of failure.

Some external hardware will still be required. The internal battery is charged transcutaneously using an external charger, for example while the user sleeps at night. A remote control or app may also be needed in order to switch the implant on and off, adjust the microphone sensitivity and indicate the battery status, among other functions.

== Benefits ==
A totally implantable — and therefore “invisible” — cochlear implant is seen as a benefit to users, particularly those who feel self-conscious about wearing visible hearing devices.

In addition, as the TICI has no external components, it is less susceptible to small breakages from knocks and falls. The lack of external parts also means that they cannot be mislaid – a common problem with pediatric users.

A TICI can function while showering, swimming, and during many types of vigorous physical activity. This allows the user to hear while carrying out these activities.
