= Electric acoustic stimulation =

Electric acoustic stimulation (EAS) is the use of a hearing aid and a cochlear implant technology together in the same ear. EAS is intended for people with high-frequency hearing loss, who can hear low-pitched sounds but not high-pitched ones. The hearing aid acoustically amplifies low-frequency sounds, while the cochlear implant electrically stimulates the middle- and high-frequency sounds. The inner ear then processes the acoustic and electric stimuli simultaneously, to give the patient the perception of sound.

In several clinical studies, EAS has proven to yield superior results compared to partially deaf patients who use only hearing aids. In order to achieve these results, it is vital to preserve the patient's residual hearing in the low frequencies.

== Introduction ==
Electric stimulation of the auditory system via cochlear implant is a commonly used technique for individuals with a severe to profound sensorineural hearing loss, as well as for those adults and children with some residual hearing.

Individuals with mild to moderate hearing loss can usually benefit from hearing aids. This acoustic stimulation proves to be particularly effective in the low frequencies, though a severe hearing loss (> 70 dB HL) above 1 kHz can be beyond the range of amplification possible via acoustic stimulation. Electric stimulation (CI), on the other hand, is capable of providing high-frequency information up to 8 kHz.

The concept of combining simultaneous electric-acoustic stimulation (EAS) for the purposes of better hearing was first described by C. von Ilberg and J. Kiefer, from the Universitätsklinik Frankfurt, Germany, in 1999. That same year the first EAS patient was implanted.

== Indications ==
There is a certain patient group that has some degree of residual hearing in the low frequencies and a severe hearing loss in the high frequencies. This group only receives limited benefits from traditional amplification because of the severity of the hearing loss in the high frequencies. They have inadequate speech comprehension, even in the best aided condition. Nor are they classic cochlear implant candidates, because of their mostly intact low frequency residual hearing.

The indications for EAS are based on the following three considerations:

1. Audiogram
2. Speech scores
3. Additional selection criteria

=== Audiogram ===
below 1.5 kHz – No or moderate HL

above 1.5 kHz – Severe to profound sensorineural hearing impairment

=== Speech scores ===
The patient's monosyllable word score should be ≤ 60% at 65 dB SPL in the best aided condition.

=== Additional selection criteria ===
Contraindicated are:

- Progressive hearing loss.
- Autoimmune disease.
- Hearing loss as a result of meningitis, otosclerosis or ossification
- Malformation or obstruction of the cochlea
- Air–bone gap > 15 dB HL
- External ear contra-indications to using amplification devices

== Hearing preservation surgery ==
A special surgical technique is the key to preserving the residual hearing of the patient. In most routine cochlear implant surgeries, any residual hearing will likely be destroyed. The residual hearing preservation rate in cochlear implantation is influenced surgical factors. The residual median hearing preservation for children was identified to be better when perimodiolar electrodes were inserted with AOS through fenestral cochleostomy.

Important factors for preserving residual hearing are:

- Special atraumatic soft electrodes
- Smallest possible acoustic trauma due to cochleostomy drilling
- Smallest possible mechanical trauma due to drilling and electrode insertion
- Avoidance of inflammatory and fibrotic reactions (contamination with blood, bone dust, middle ear bacteria, etc.)
- The use of drugs that will aid in the preservation of hearing

Two methods are commonly used for inserting the electrode into the cochlea:

- Round-window insertion
- Cochleostomy insertion

Most recently, round-window insertion has found a wider acceptance because it is considered to be less traumatic. The best results have been achieved with electrode insertion depths of 18 mm, which corresponds to the approximate place in the normal sized cochlea where 1000 Hz is processed. As a result, frequencies below 1000 Hz are stimulated acoustically, and above 1000 Hz are stimulated electrically.

For those interested in gaining the latest expertise necessary for a successful treatment of EAS candidates, surgical and professional training courses are provided by companies that offer EAS products.

== EAS electrodes for cochlear implants ==
The design of the electrode array (shape, length, and bundle flexibility) is one of the key factors for preserving residual hearing. The surgical technique used for electrode array insertion is also important: the smaller the force used to insert the electrode, the greater the chance of protecting the fragile structures within the cochlea. The round window approach has been shown to be more successful at preserving residual hearing.

Today only lateral wall electrodes are used. Studies with pre-shaped (modiolus-hugging electrodes) have been proven to be not so effective.

== EAS audio processors ==
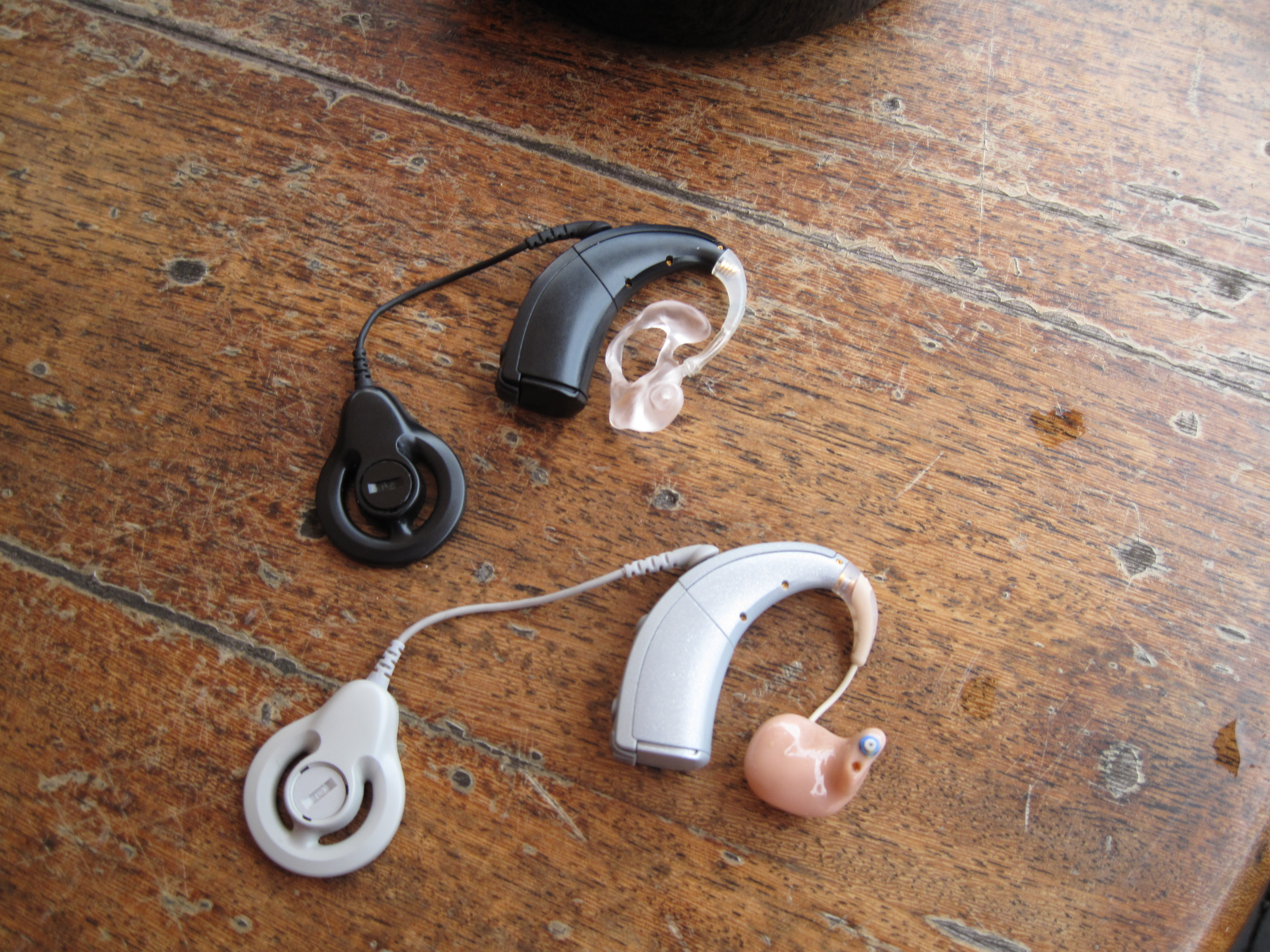
Comparison of a black standard processor for CI and a gray version for electric acoustic stimulation.

EAS audio processors use one microphone for the input but have two separate digital sound processors for differentiated processing.

The parallel processing of these signals, however, is performed separately and optimized for both acoustic hearing (focusing on low-frequency hearing) and cochlear implant stimulation (focusing on high-frequency hearing). The hearing aid is integrated in the ear hook and the amplified signals are forwarded to the auditory pathway via an ear mould. The ear mould used for the acoustic component is similar to a conventional hearing aid ear mould and can be exchanged.

As EAS audio processors are based on the design of a cochlear implant audio processor, they usually offer the same range of assistive listening devices (ALDs) as a cochlear implant. ALDs allows the sound from mobile phones, TVs or external microphones to be sent to the audio processor directly, rather than being picked up by the audio processor's microphone. The direct transmission improves the sound quality for the user, making it easier to, for example, talk on the phone or stream music.

All three major EAS manufacturers offer various ALD options, including direct connectivity to Bluetooth-enabled devices. EAS audio processors are also often compatible with older ALD technology, such as telecoil.

== See also ==
- Cochlear implant
- Hearing aid
- Brain implant
