= Samuel E. Blum =

American chemist (1920–2013)

- Born: August 28, 1920; New York City
- Died: January 9, 2013 (aged 92)
- Education: Rutgers University, 1942, 1950; UCLA, 1944
- Awards: Induction to National Inventors Hall of Fame, 2002; R.W. Wood Prize, 2004; Russ Prize, 2013
- Scientific career
- Fields: Chemistry, Physics

Samuel E. Blum (August 28, 1920 – January 9, 2013) was an American chemist and physicist. He was a researcher at the Battelle Memorial Institute in Columbus, Ohio, working for government and private companies. He worked with semiconductor materials, which was his specialization until his retirement from IBM Watson Research Center in 1990.

Blum's most notable invention is the patent on the ultraviolet excimer laser, which is used in surgical and dental procedures, which provided the laser technology that is central in LASIK (laser-assisted in situ keratomileusis) surgery. The co-inventors included chemist Rangaswamy Srinivasan and physicist James J. Wynne. The patent was filed in December 1982 and was issued on November 15, 1988. The contribution of this technology to LASIK has brought 20/20 vision and freedom from eyeglasses and contact lenses to millions of people. For this innovation, he was inducted to the National Inventors Hall of Fame (2002) and received the R. W. Wood Prize (2004) from the Optical Society of America (OSA). In 2013, Blum, Srinivasan, and Wynne were awarded the Russ Prize from the National Academy of Engineering for this work.
