= James J. Wynne =

American physicist (born 1943)

- Born: March 19, 1943 (age 83); Brooklyn, New York
- Education: Harvard University, B.A. 1964, PhD 1969
- Awards: National Inventors Hall of Fame (2002); R. W. Wood Prize (2004); National Medal of Technology and Innovation (2011); Russ Prize (2013); National Academy of Engineering (2015); American Physical Society Distinguished Lectureship Award on the Applications of Physics (2015)
- Scientific career
- Fields: Physics

James J. Wynne (born March 19, 1943, in Brooklyn) is an American physicist at the IBM Watson Research Center in Yorktown Heights, NY.

Wynne pioneered the use of excimer lasers for medical applications, most notably LASIK. He received the National Medal of Technology and Innovation on February 2, 2013, from U.S. President Obama, together with Rangaswamy Srinivasan and (posthumously) Samuel Blum for their contributions to laser eye surgery.

Wynne studied at Harvard University, receiving a bachelor's degree in 1964, master's degree in 1965 and doctorate in 1969 in applied physics. He then joined IBM Research, first at IBM Zurich Research Laboratory and then at the Thomas J. Watson Research Center. His research has been in nonlinear optics of semiconductors and insulators, nonlinear spectroscopy of atomic and molecular vapors physics of Clusters, using the laser to etch and in medicine (e.g., fluorescence studies of tissue).

In 1981, with Rangaswamy Srinivasan and Samuel E. Blum at IBM, he pioneered the use of excimer lasers in surgery. Based on an early experiment in which an excimer laser was able to make clean cuts in dead cartilage from a Thanksgiving turkey, without thermal damage, they recognized the potential for surgery. Srinivasan later developed on this basis, with Bodil Braren and Stephen Trokel, applications to eye surgery in the form of photorefractive keratectomy (PRK) and LASIK. Wynne himself worked on applications in dermatology with doctors at New York University Medical School (1985).

Wynne was Manager for nonlinear spectroscopy, laser physics and chemistry and biology and molecular physics at the IBM Thomas J. Watson Research Center. He was a visiting scholar at the University of Chicago, the University of Rochester, the Dartmouth College and Johns Hopkins University. He is now responsible for education outreach at the IBM Thomas J. Watson Center. He also conducts research on the development of ″smart scalpels″ with excimer lasers for the removal of necrotic skin from burn injuries.

Wynne received the R. W. Wood Prize of the Optical Society of America (OSA) in 2004, the Rank Prize in Optoelectronics in 2010, the National Medal of Technology and Innovation for 2011, the Russ Prize of the National Academy of Engineering in 2013, and the American Physical Society (APS) Distinguished Lectureship Award on the Applications of Physics in 2015. He is a Fellow of the APS and the OSA. He was inducted into the National Inventors Hall of Fame in 2002. He was co-founder of the Forum of Education of APS and was a member of the Committees for Education of both the APS and the OSA. In 2015 he was elected to the National Academy of Engineering.

1982–1983, he was co-editor of an issue of the Journal of the Optical Society of America.
