= Erwin Hochmair =

Austrian electrical engineer (born 1940)

Erwin S. Hochmair
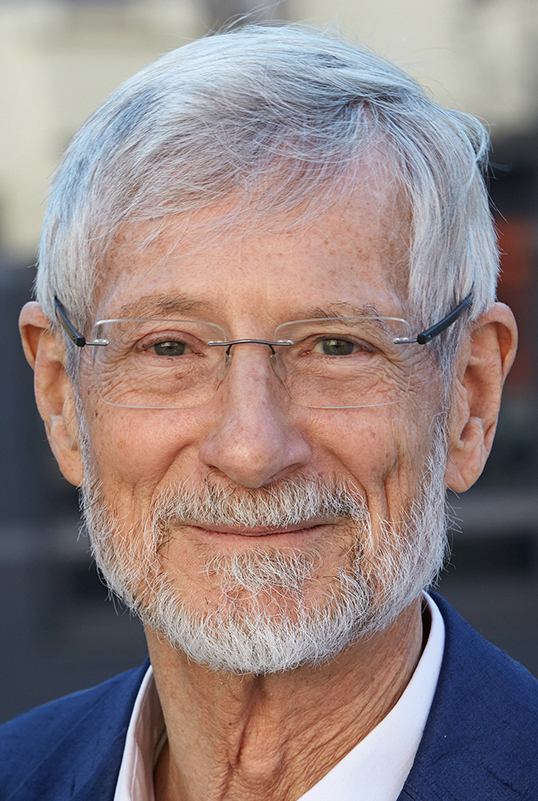
- Born: 1940 (age 85–86); Vienna, Austria
- Spouse: Ingeborg Hochmair
- Awards: IEEE Best Paper Award; Holzer-Preis; Erwin Schrödinger Prize
- Scientific career
- Fields: circuit design, signal processing, cochlear implant design

Erwin Hochmair (born 1940) is an Austrian electrical engineer whose research focuses in the fields of biomedical engineering and cochlear implant design. He has been a professor at the Institute of Experimental Physics, University of Innsbruck since 1986. He has authored and co-authored over 100 technical articles and holds about 50 patents. He is the co-founder and owner of the medical device company MED-EL.

== Biography ==
Hochmair was born in Vienna in 1940. He received his Dipl.-Ing. and D.Tech. degrees in electrical engineering from the Technical University of Vienna in 1964 and 1967, respectively. He joined the Institute for Physical Electronics of the Technical University of Vienna in 1965, where he taught courses on linear integrated circuits and circuit design. He worked as a research associate at Marshall Space Flight Center, in the U.S. from 1970 to 1972 where he designed analog integrated circuits in CMOS technology. He was a visiting associate professor at Stanford University in 1979.

=== Cochlear implant design ===
In 1975, the Austrian Research Council supported Hochmair's cochlear implant project by a grant of 110,000 ATS, roughly equivalent to $11,000 USD. Together with his wife Ingeborg Hochmair, who holds several degrees in electrical engineering, he designed a device that was able to stimulate the fibers of the auditory nerve at several locations within the cochlea. A previous implant design by William F. House could only stimulate cochlea at one site.

They built a multichannel intra-cochlear electrode, and developed all the implantable and the external electronics for the transcutaneous transmission, the coding and decoding of circuits and the electrode driving circuitry while trying to minimize the power consumption. On December 16, 1977 he was part of the team responsible for implanting the first single-channel cochlear implant. They established MED-EL in 1989, a cochlear implant manufacture company. In 2013, Ingeborg Hochmair won the coveted Lasker Award, often considered the "American Nobel Prize," for this development.

== Awards and honors ==
- 1977: Best Paper Award, International Solid-State Circuits Conference
- 2003: Erwin Schrödinger Prize, Austrian Academy of Sciences
- 2004: Honorary Doctorate of Medicine, Technical University of Munich
- 2004: Holzer Prize, Technical University of Vienna
- 2014: Austrian Cross of Honour for Science and Art, First Class
- 2014: Russ Prize, National Academy of Engineering
- 2014: Finalist for the European Inventor Award
- 2015: Johann Joseph Ritter von Prechtl Medal, Technical University of Vienna
- 2016: Eduard Rhein Prize, Eduard Rhein Foundation
- 2026: Queen Elizabeth Prize for Engineering

== Academic papers ==
- Hochmair is the author or co-author on more than 50 publications in the field of electrical engineering and cochlear implant technology.
- Some of his most prominent papers include:
- Teissl, Ch.; Kremser, Ch.; Hochmair, E. S.; Hochmair-Desoyer, I. J. (1999) Magnetic resonance imaging and cochlear implants: Compatibility and safety aspects. Journal of Magnetic Resonance Imaging, Bd. 9, S. 26-38.
- Zierhofer, C.; Hochmair, E. (1996) Geometric approach for coupling enhancement of magnetically coupled coils. IEEE Transactions on Biomedical Engineering, Bd. 43 (7), S. 708-714.
- Zierhofer, C.; Hochmair, I.; Hochmair, E. (1995) Electronic design of a cochlear implant for multichannel high-rate pulsatile stimulation strategies. IEEE Transactions on Rehabilitation Engineering, Bd. 3 (1), S. 112-116.
- Hochmair, E. S. (1984) System optimization for improved accuracy in transcutaneous signal and power transmission. IEEE Transactions on Biomedical Engineering, Bd. BME-31, S. 177-186.
- Hochmair, E. S.; Hochmair-Desoyer, I. J. (1981) An implanted auditory eight-channel stimulator for the deaf. Medical & Biological Engineering & Computing, Bd. 19, S. 141-148.
