= Cochlear implant =

Prosthesis enabling hearing

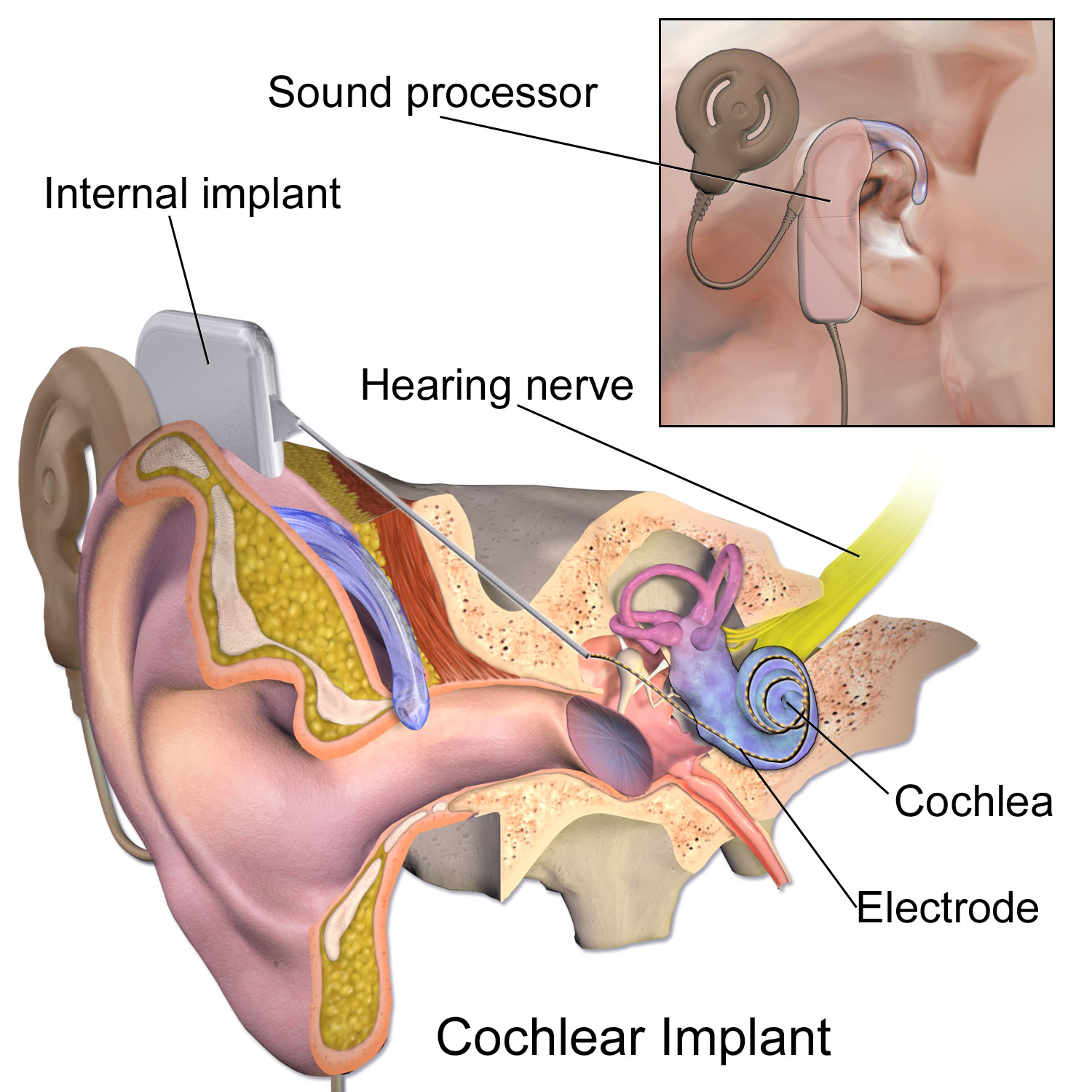
- Diagram of a cochlear implant

A cochlear implant (CI) is a surgically implanted neuroprosthesis that provides a person who has moderate-to-profound sensorineural hearing loss with sound perception. With the help of therapy, cochlear implants may allow for improved speech understanding in both quiet and noisy environments. A CI bypasses acoustic hearing by direct electrical stimulation of the auditory nerve. Through everyday listening and auditory training, cochlear implants allow both children and adults to learn to interpret those signals as speech and sound.

The implant has two main components. The outside component is the sound processor, which contains microphones, electronics that include digital signal processor (DSP) chips, battery, and a coil that transmits a signal to the implant across the skin. It is generally worn behind the ear, though some self-contained sound processors take the form of a pebble-shaped unit worn directly on the side of the head over the implant site, held in place by magnetic attraction to the internal implant. The sound processor could also be attached to clothing, for example, in the case of young children. The inside component is the actual implant, which contains a coil to receive signals, electronics, and an array of electrodes that stimulate the cochlear nerve, which is placed into the cochlea.

The surgical procedure is performed under general anesthesia. Surgical risks are minimal, and most individuals will undergo outpatient surgery and go home the same day. However, some individuals will experience dizziness, and on rare occasions, tinnitus or facial nerve bruising.

From the early days of implants in the 1970s and 1980s, speech perception via an implant improved greatly, though gains have plateaued since the introduction of modern sound coding strategies in the 1990s. More than 200,000 people in the United States had received a CI through 2019. Many users of modern implants gain reasonable to good hearing and speech perception skills post-implantation, especially when combined with lipreading. One of the challenges that remain with these implants is that hearing and speech understanding skills after implantation show a wide range of variation across individual implant users. Factors such as age of implantation, parental involvement and education level, duration and cause of hearing loss, how the implant is situated in the cochlea, the overall health of the cochlear nerve, and individual capabilities of relearning are considered to contribute to this variation.

== History ==
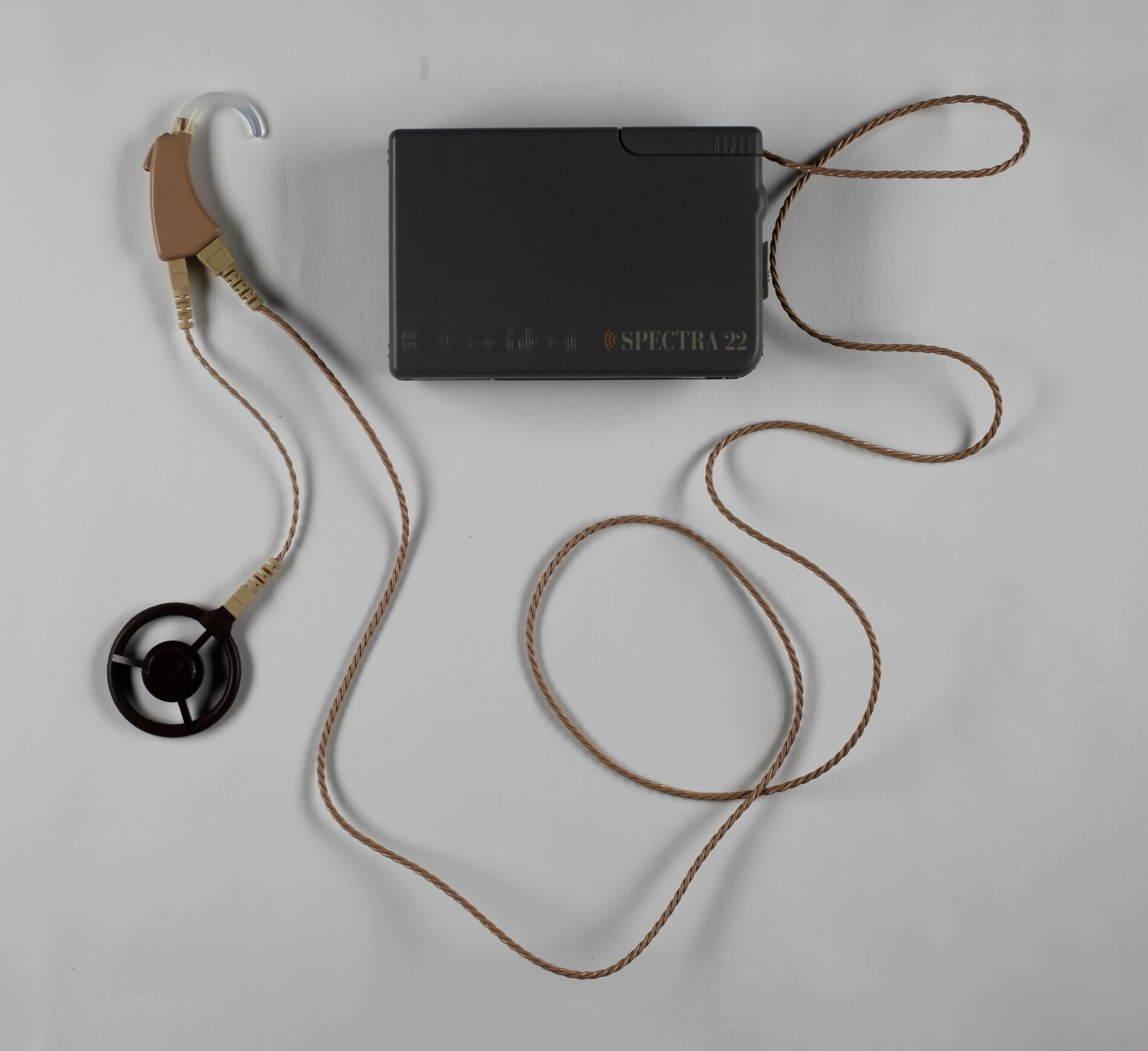
1994 body-worn Cochlear Spectra processor. Early cochlear implant users utilized body-worn processors like this one.

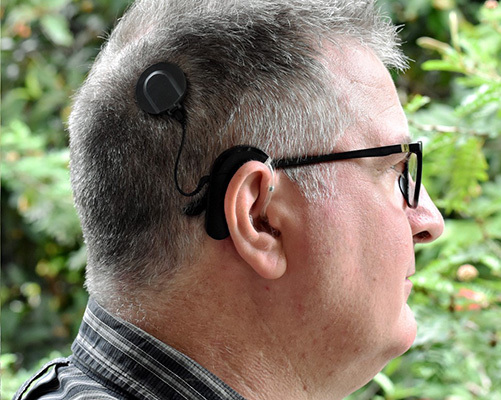
Cochlear implant recipient utilizing a behind-the-ear processor

André Djourno and Charles Eyriès invented the original cochlear implant in 1957. Their design distributed stimulation using a single channel.

William House also invented a cochlear implant in 1961. In 1964, Blair Simmons and Robert L. White implanted a single-channel electrode in a patient's cochlea at Stanford University. However, research indicated that these single-channel cochlear implants were of limited usefulness because they cannot stimulate different areas of the cochlea at different times to allow differentiation between low and mid-to-high frequencies as required for detecting speech.

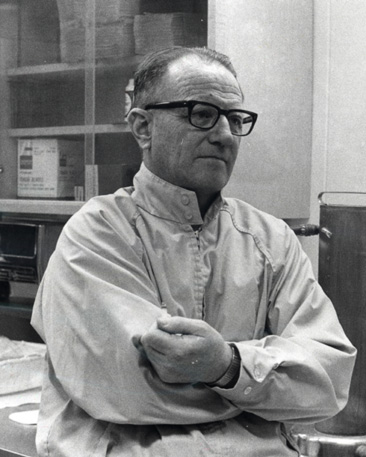
Robin Michelson – early creator of the Cochlear Implant

The next step in the development of the CI was its clinical trial on a cohort of patients. In the late 1960s, Robin Michelson and colleague Melvin Bartz constructed a cochlear device with biocompatible materials that can be implanted in human patients. This system was implanted in 4 patients, and the report of the hearing results was a watershed for clinically applicable cochlear implants. Robin Michelson, Robert Schindler, and Michael Merzenich at the University of California, San Francisco (UCSF), conducted these experiments in 1970 and 1971. Michelson, a clinical pioneer, and Merzenich, a talented basic scientist with a solid foundation in neurophysiology, were integral in the development of the UCSF cochlear implant team. Michelson was recognized for implanting a single-channel device into a congenitally deaf woman. She demonstrated auditory sensations from stimulation, as well as pitch perception for stimulus frequencies less than 600 Hz. Unfortunately, this patient had no word recognition. His pioneering work was presented, but not well-received at the 1971 annual meeting of the American Otological Society (Michelson, 1971 and Merzenich et al., 1973). In 1973, the first international conference on the "electrical stimulation of the acoustic nerve as a treatment for profound sensorineural deafness in man" was organized in San Francisco.

NASA engineer Adam Kissiah started working in the mid-1970s on the design for a cochlear implant. Kissiah used his knowledge learned while working as an electronics instrumentation engineer for NASA. This work took place over three years, when Kissiah would spend his lunch breaks and evenings in Kennedy Space Center's technical library, studying the impact of engineering principles on the inner ear. In 1977, NASA helped Kissiah obtain a patent for his cochlear implant; Kissiah later sold the patent rights. A commercial product based on Kissiah's design, developed by BIOSTIM Inc., was tested but failed to reach the marketplace.

The modern multi-channel cochlear implant was independently developed and commercialized by two separate teams—one led by Graeme Clark in Australia and another by Ingeborg Hochmair and her future husband, Erwin Hochmair in Austria, with the Hochmairs' device first implanted in a person in December 1977 and Clark's in August 1978. The Hochmairs' 1977 implant, though an early milestone, did not in its original 8-channel form lead directly to the modern device. Testing of that first system failed to produce open speech understanding and the Hochmairs changed their approach. It was Clark's multi-channel design, commercialized as the Nucleus device by Cochlear Limited, that became the first multi-channel cochlear implant to receive FDA approval in 1985, and successive iterations of the Nucleus device went on to become the most widely used cochlear implants in the world.

== Parts ==
Cochlear implants bypass most of the peripheral auditory system, which receives sound and converts that sound into movements of hair cells in the cochlea; the deflection of stereocilia causes an influx of potassium ions into the hair cells, and the depolarization in turn stimulates calcium influx, which increases release of the neurotransmitter glutamate. Excitation of the cochlear nerve by the neurotransmitter sends signals to the brain, which creates the experience of sound. With an implant, instead, the devices pick up sound and digitize it, convert that digitized sound into electrical signals, and transmit those signals to electrodes embedded in the cochlea. The electrodes electrically stimulate the cochlear nerve, causing it to send signals to the brain.

There are several systems available, but generally they have the following components:

External:

- one or more microphones that pick up sound from the environment
- a speech processor that selectively filters sound to prioritize audible speech
- a transmitter that sends power and the processed sound signals across the skin to the internal device by radio frequency transmission

Internal:

- a receiver/stimulator, which receives signals from the speech processor and converts them into electric impulses
- an electrode array embedded in the cochlea

Several manufacturers currently have a totally implantable cochlear implant (TICI) in development or undergoing clinical testing. This new type of cochlear implant incorporates all the current external components of an audio processor into the internal implant. The lack of external components makes the implant invisible from the outside and also means it is less likely to be damaged or broken. On the other side, the development of a TICI faces especially two technical hurdles: the energy supply and the design of the implantable microphone. Initial clinical trials of TICIs have demonstrated safety and comparable performance to conventional cochlear implants. A study involving a research TICI indicated that users experienced high levels of hearing performance, although some challenges with microphone sensitivity were noted.

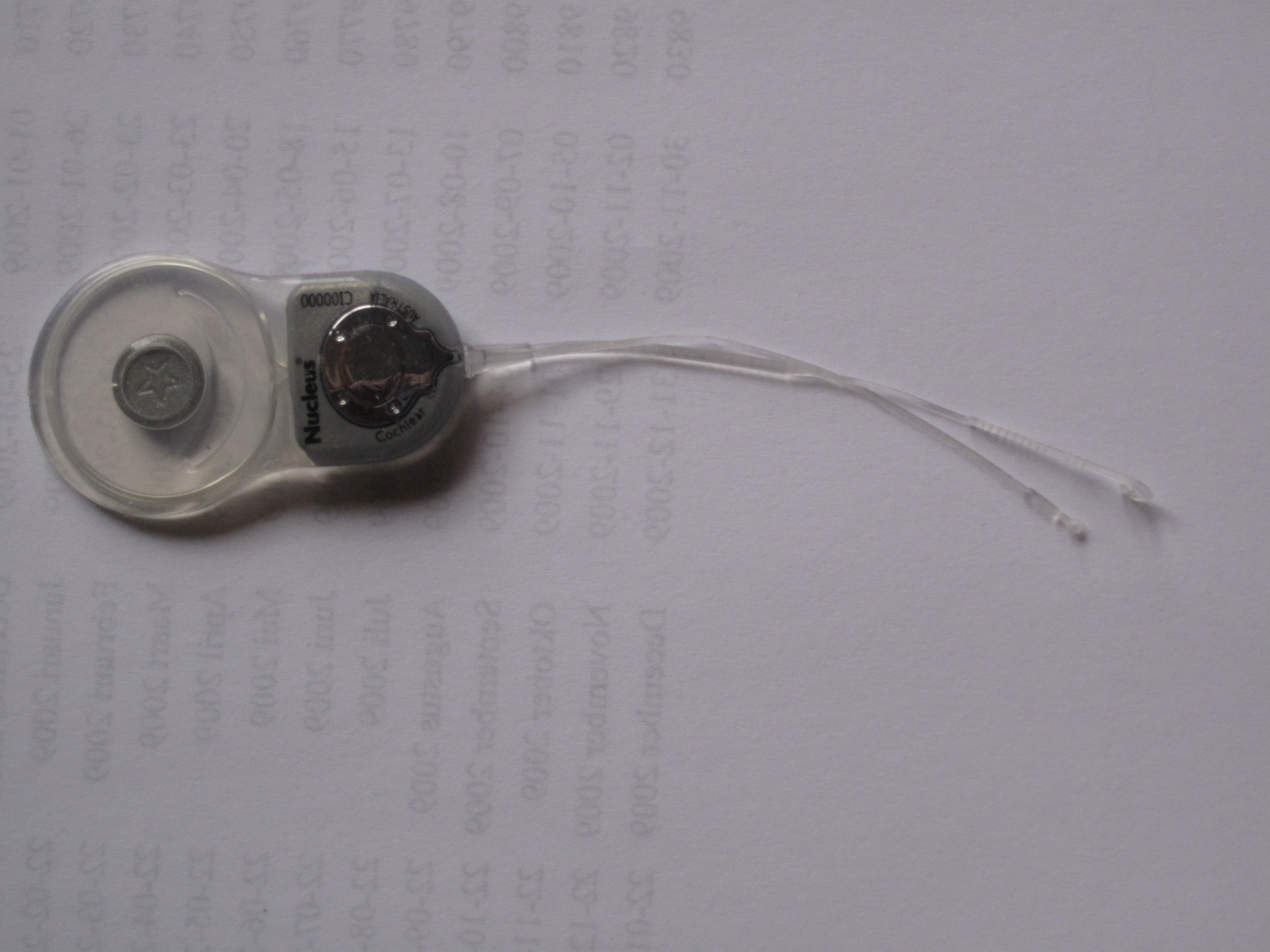
Internal components of a conventional device (not yet implanted)

=== Assistive listening devices ===
Most modern cochlear implants can be used with a range of assistive listening devices (ALDs), which help people to hear better in challenging listening situations. These situations could include talking on the phone, watching TV, or listening to a speaker or teacher. With an ALD, the sound from devices, including mobile phones, or from an external microphone is sent to the audio processor directly, rather than being picked up by the audio processor's microphone. This direct transmission improves the sound quality for the user, making it easier to talk on the phone or stream music.

ALDs come in many forms, such as neckloops, pens, and specialist battery pack covers. Modern ALDs are usually able to receive sound from any Bluetooth device, including phones and computers, before transmitting it wirelessly to the audio processor. Most cochlear implants are also compatible with older ALD technology, such as a telecoil.

== Surgical procedure ==
=== Surgical techniques ===
Implantation in children and adults can be done safely with few surgical complications, and most individuals will undergo outpatient surgery and go home the same day.

Occasionally, the very young, the very old, or patients with a significant number of medical diseases at once may remain for overnight observation in the hospital. The procedure can be performed in an ambulatory surgery center in healthy individuals.

The surgical procedure most often used to implant the device is called mastoidectomy with facial recess approach (MFRA).

The procedure is usually done under general anesthesia. Complications of the procedure are rare, but include mastoiditis, otitis media (acute or with effusion), shifting of the implanted device requiring a second procedure, damage to the facial nerve, damage to the chorda tympani, and wound infections.

Cochlear implantation surgery is considered a clean procedure with an infection rate of less than 3%. Guidelines suggest that routine prophylactic antibiotics are not required. However, the potential cost of a postoperative infection is high (including the possibility of implant loss); therefore, a single preoperative intravenous injection of antibiotics is recommended.

The rate of complications is about 12% for minor complications and 3% for major complications; major complications include infections, facial paralysis, and device failure.

Although up to 20 new cases of post-CI bacterial meningitis occur annually worldwide, data demonstrates a reducing incidence. To avoid the risk of bacterial meningitis, the CDC recommends that adults and children undergoing CI receive age-appropriate vaccines that generate antibodies to Streptococcus pneumoniae.

The rate of transient facial nerve palsy is estimated to be approximately 1%. Device failure requiring reimplantation is estimated to occur 2.5–6% of the time. Up to one-third of people experience disequilibrium, vertigo, or vestibular weakness lasting more than one week after the procedure; in people under 70, these symptoms generally resolve over weeks to months, but in people over 70, the problems tend to persist.

In the past, cochlear implants were only approved for people who were deaf in both ears; as of 2014, a cochlear implant had been used experimentally in some people who had acquired deafness in one ear after they had learned how to speak, and none who were deaf in one ear from birth; clinical studies as of 2014 had been too small to draw generalizations.

=== Alternative surgical technique ===
Other approaches, such as going through the suprameatal triangle, are used. A systematic literature review published in 2016 found that studies comparing the two approaches were generally small, not randomized, and retrospective, so they were not useful for making generalizations; it is not known which approach is safer or more effective.

=== Endoscopic cochlear implantation ===
With the increased utilization of endoscopic ear surgery as popularized by Muaaz Tarabichi, there have been multiple published reports on the use of endoscopic technique in cochlear implant surgery. However, this has been motivated by marketing, and there is clear indication of increased morbidity associated with this technique as reported by Tarabichi.

=== Complications of cochlear implant surgery ===
As cochlear implant surgical techniques have advanced over the last four decades, the global complication rate for CI surgery in both children and adults has decreased from more than 35% in 1991 to less than 10% at present. The risk of postoperative facial nerve injury has also decreased over the last several decades to less than 1%, most of which demonstrated complete return of function within six months. The rate of permanent paralysis is approximately 1 per 1,000 surgeries and likely less than that in experienced CI centers.

The majority of complications following CI surgery are minor, requiring only conservative medical management or prolongation of hospital stay. Less than 5% of all complications are major, resulting in surgical intervention or readmission to the hospital. Reported rates of revision cochlear implant surgery vary in adults and children from 3.8% to 8%, with the most common indications being device failure, infection, and migration of the implant or electrode. Disequilibrium and vertigo after CI surgery can occur, but the symptoms tend to be mild and short-lived. CI rarely results in significant or persistent adverse effects on the vestibular system when hearing conservation surgical techniques are practiced. Moreover, gait and postural stability may actually improve post-implantation.

== Outcomes ==
Cochlear implant outcomes can be measured using speech recognition ability and functional improvements measured using patient-reported outcome measures. While the degree of improvement after cochlear implantation may vary, the majority of patients who receive cochlear implants demonstrate a significant improvement in speech recognition ability compared to their preoperative condition.

Multiple meta-analyses of the literature from 2018 showed that CI users have large improvements in quality of life after cochlear implantation. This improvement occurs in many different facets of life that extend beyond communication, including improved ability to engage in social activities, decreased mental effort from listening, and improved environmental sound awareness. Deaf adolescents with cochlear implants attending mainstream educational settings report high levels of scholastic self-esteem, friendship self-esteem, and global self-esteem. They also tend to hold mostly positive attitudes towards their cochlear implants, and as a part of their identity, a majority either do "not really think about" their hearing loss, or are "proud of it." Though advancements in cochlear implant technology have helped patients in their understanding of language, users are still unable to understand suprasegmental portions of language, including pitch.

A study by Johns Hopkins University determined that for a three-year-old child who receives them, cochlear implants can save $30,000 to $50,000 in special-education costs for elementary and secondary schools, as the child is more likely to be mainstreamed in school and thus use fewer support services than similarly deaf children.

== Efficacy ==
A 2019 study found that bilateral cochlear implantation was widely regarded as the most beneficial hearing intervention for acceptable candidates, although it is more likely to be performed in children than adults. The study also found that the efficacy of bilateral implantation could be improved by enhancing communication between the two implants and by developing sound coding strategies specifically for bilateral users.

Early research reviews found that the ability to communicate in spoken language was better the earlier the implantation was performed. The reviews also found that, overall, while cochlear implants provide open-set speech understanding for the majority of implanted profoundly hearing-impaired children, it was not possible to accurately predict the specific outcome of the given implanted child. Research since then has reported long-term socio-economic benefits for children as well as audiological outcomes, including improved sound localization and speech perception. A consensus statement from the European Bilateral Pediatric Cochlear Implant Forum also confirmed the importance of bilateral cochlear implantation in children. In adults, new research shows that bilateral implantation can improve quality of life and speech intelligibility in quiet and noise.

A 2015 review examined whether CI implantation to treat people with bilateral hearing loss had any effect on tinnitus. This review found the quality of evidence to be poor and the results variable: overall total tinnitus suppression rates for patients who had tinnitus prior to surgery varied from 8% to 45% of people who received CI; a decrease in tinnitus was seen in 25% to 72% of people; for 0% to 36% of the people, there was no change; an increase in tinnitus occurred in between 0% and 25% of patients; and, in between 0% and 10% of cases, people who did not have tinnitus before the procedure, got it. Further research found that the electrical stimulation of the CI is at least partly responsible for the general reduction in symptoms. A 2019 study found that although tinnitus suppression in patients with CIs is multifactorial, simply having the CI switched on without any audiological input (while standing alone in a soundproof booth) reduced the symptoms of tinnitus. This would suggest that it is the electrical stimulation that explains the decrease in tinnitus symptoms for many patients, and not only the increased access to sound.

A 2015 literature review on the use of CI for people with auditory neuropathy spectrum disorder found that, as of that date, description and diagnosis of the condition were too heterogeneous to make clear claims about whether CI is a safe and effective way to manage it.

The data for cochlear implant outcomes in older adults differs. A 2016 research study found that age at implantation was highly correlated with postoperative speech understanding performance for various test measures. In this study, people who were implanted at age 65 or older performed significantly worse on speech perception testing in quiet and in noisy conditions compared to younger CI users. Other studies have shown different outcomes, with some reporting that adults implanted at the age of 65 and older showed audiological and speech discrimination outcomes similar to younger adults. While cochlear implants demonstrate substantial benefit across all age groups, results will depend on cognitive factors that are ultimately highly age-dependent. However, studies have documented the benefit of cochlear implants in octogenarians.

The effects of aging on central auditory processing abilities are thought to play an important role in impacting an individual's speech perception with a cochlear implant. The Lancet reported that untreated hearing loss in adults is the number one modifiable risk factor for dementia. In 2017, a study also reported that adults using a cochlear implant had significantly improved cognitive outcomes, including working memory, reaction time, and cognitive flexibility, compared to people who were waiting to receive a cochlear implant.

Prolonged duration of deafness is another factor that is thought to have a negative impact on overall speech understanding outcomes for CI users. However, a study found no statistical difference in the speech understanding abilities of CI patients over 65 who had been hearing impaired for 30 years or more prior to implantation. In general, outcomes for CI patients are dependent upon the individual's level of motivation, expectations, exposure to speech stimuli, and consistent participation in aural rehabilitation programs.

A 2016 systematic review of CI for people with unilateral hearing loss (UHL) found that of the studies conducted and published, none were randomized, only one evaluated a control group, and no study was blinded. After eliminating multiple uses of the same subjects, the authors found that 137 people with UHL had received a CI. While acknowledging the weakness of the data, the authors found that CI in people with UHL improves sound localization compared with other treatments in people who lost hearing after they learned to speak; in the one study that examined this, CI did improve sound localization in people with UHL who lost hearing before learning to speak. It appeared to improve speech perception and to reduce tinnitus.

In terms of quality of life, several studies have shown that cochlear implants are beneficial in many aspects of quality of life, including communication improvements and positive effects on social, emotional, psychological, and physical well-being. A 2017 narrative review also concluded that the quality of life scores of children using cochlear implants were comparable to those of children without hearing loss. Studies involving adults of all ages reported significant improvement in QoL after implantation when compared to adults with hearing aids. This was often independent of audiological performance.

== Society and culture ==
=== Usage ===
As of October 2010, approximately 188,000 individuals had been fitted with cochlear implants worldwide. As of December 2012, the same publication cited approximately 324,000 cochlear implant devices having been surgically implanted. In the U.S., roughly 58,000 devices were implanted in adults and 38,000 in children. As of 2016, the Ear Foundation in the United Kingdom estimates the number of cochlear implant recipients in the world to be about 600,000. The American Cochlear Implant Alliance estimates that 217,000 people received CIs in the United States through the end of 2019.

=== Cost and insurance ===
Cochlear implantation includes the medical device as well as related services and procedures, including preoperative testing, the surgery, and aftercare that includes audiology and speech language pathology services. These are provided over time by a team of clinicians with specialized training. All of these services, as well as the cochlear implant device and related peripherals, are part of the medical intervention and are typically covered by health insurance in the United States and many areas of the world. These medical services and procedures include candidacy evaluation, hospital services inclusive of supplies and medications used during surgery, the surgeon and other physicians such as anesthesiologists, the cochlear implant device and system kit, and programming and (re)habilitation following the surgery. In many countries around the world, the cost of cochlear implantation and aftercare is covered by health insurance. However, financial factors impact the evaluation selection process. Children with public health insurance or no health insurance are less likely to receive the implant before 2 years old.

In the US, as cochlear implants have become more commonplace and accepted as a valuable and cost effective health intervention, insurance coverage has expanded to include private insurance, Medicare, Tricare, the VA System, other federal health plans, and Medicaid. In September 2022 the Centers for Medicare & Medicaid Services expanded coverage of cochlear implants for appropriate candidates under Medicare. Candidates must demonstrate limited benefit with appropriately fit hearing aids, but with criteria now defined by test scores of less than or equal to 60% correct in the best-aided listening condition on recorded tests of open-set sentence recognition. Just as there is with any medical procedure, there are typically co-pays, which vary depending upon the insurance plan.

In the United Kingdom, the NHS covers cochlear implants in full, as do Medicare in Australia, and the Department of Health in Ireland, Seguridad Social in Spain, Sistema Sanitario Nazionale in Italy, Social security in France, Bituah Leumi in Israel, and the Ministry of Health or ACC (depending on the cause of deafness) in New Zealand. In Germany and Austria, the cost is covered by most health insurance organizations.

=== Public health ===
6.1% of the world population live with hearing loss, and it is predicted that by 2050, more than 900 million people around the globe will have a disabling hearing loss. According to a WHO report, unaddressed hearing loss costs the world 980 billion dollars annually. Particularly hard hit are the healthcare and educational sectors, as well as societal costs. 53% of these costs are attributable to low- and middle-income countries.

The WHO reports that cochlear implants have been shown to be a cost-effective way to mitigate the challenges of hearing loss. In a low-to-middle-income setting, every dollar invested in unilateral cochlear implants has a return on investment of 1.46 dollars. This rises to a return on investment of 4.09 dollars in an upper-middle-income setting. A study in Colombia assessed the lifetime investments made in 68 children who received cochlear implants at an early age. Taking into account the cost of the device and any other medical costs, follow-up, speech therapy, batteries and travel, each child required an average investment of US$99 000 over the course of their life (assuming a life span of 78 years for women and 72 years for men). The study concluded that for every dollar invested in rehabilitation of a child with a cochlear implant, there was a return on investment of US$2.07.

=== Manufacturers ===
As of 2021, four cochlear implant devices approved for use in the United States are manufactured by Cochlear Limited, the Advanced Bionics division of Sonova, MED-EL, and Oticon Medical. As of June 2023, Oticon Medical changed ownership to Cochlear Ltd.

In Europe, Africa, Asia, South America, and Canada, an additional device manufactured by Neurelec (later acquired by Oticon Medical) was available. A device made by Nurotron (China) was also available in some parts of the world. Each manufacturer has adapted some of the successful innovations of the other companies to its own devices. There is no consensus that any one of these implants is superior to the others. Users of all devices report a wide range of performance after implantation.

=== Criticism and controversy ===
Much of the strongest objection to cochlear implants has come from within the deaf community, some of whom are pre-lingually deaf people whose first language is a sign language. Some in the deaf community call cochlear implants audist and an affront to their culture, which, as they view it, is a minority threatened by the hearing majority. This is an old problem for the deaf community, going back as far as the 18th century with the argument of manualism vs. oralism. This is consistent with medicalization and the standardization of the "normal" body in the 19th century, when differences between normal and abnormal began to be debated. It is important to consider the sociocultural context, particularly in regard to the deaf community, which has its own unique language and culture. This accounts for the cochlear implant being seen as an affront to their culture, as many do not believe that deafness is something that needs to be cured. However, it has also been argued that this does not necessarily have to be the case: the cochlear implant can act as a tool deaf people can use to access the "hearing world" without losing their deaf identity.

Cochlear implants for congenitally deaf children are most effective when implanted at a young age. Children who have had confirmed severe hearing loss can receive the implant as young as 9 months old. Evidence shows that deaf children of deaf parents (or with fluent signers as daily caregivers) learn signed language as effectively as hearing peers. Some deaf-community advocates recommend that all deaf children should learn sign language from birth, but more than 90% of deaf children are born to hearing parents. Since it takes years to become fluent in sign language, deaf children who grow up without amplification such as hearing aids or cochlear implants will not have daily access to fluent language models in households without fluent signers.

Critics of cochlear implants from deaf cultures also assert that the cochlear implant and the subsequent therapy often become the focus of the child's identity at the expense of language acquisition and ease of communication in sign language and deaf identity. They believe that measuring a child's success only by their mastery of speech will lead to a poor self-image as "disabled" (because the implants do not produce normal hearing) rather than having the healthy self-concept of a proudly deaf person. However, these assertions are not supported by research. The first children to receive cochlear implants as infants are only in their 20s (as of 2020), and anecdotal evidence points to a high level of satisfaction in this cohort, most of whom don't consider their deafness their primary identity.

Children with cochlear implants are most likely to be educated with listening and spoken language, without sign language, and are often not educated with other deaf children who use sign language. Cochlear implants have been one of the technological and social factors implicated in the decline of sign languages in the developed world. Some Deaf activists have labeled the widespread implantation of children as a cultural genocide.

As the trend for cochlear implants in children grows, deaf-community advocates have tried to counter the "either or" formulation of oralism vs. manualism with a "both and" or "bilingual-bicultural" approach; some schools are now successfully integrating cochlear implants with sign language in their educational programs. However, there is disagreement among researchers about the effectiveness of methods using both sign and speech as compared to sign or speech alone.

Another point of controversy made by advocates are that there are racial disparities in the cochlear implantation evaluation process. Data taken from 2010-2020 at one academic tertiary care institution showed that 68.5% of patients referred for evaluation were White, 18.5% were Black, and 12.3% were Asian; however the institution's main service area was 46.9% White, 42.3% Black, and 7.7% Asian. It was also shown that the Black patients who were referred for evaluation to receive the implants had greater hearing loss compared to White patients who were also referred. Based on this study, it is shown that Black patients receive cochlear implants at a disproportionately lower rate than White patients.

An additional criticism involves the cost of implant upgrades. The manufacturers introduce new models on a regular basis and stop servicing older models. When this happens, a user who wishes to ensure continued functioning of the implant is required to buy new equipment. This was evident in India for impoverished families whose children received cochlear implants.

== Notable recipients (partial list) ==
- Jack Ashley, Baron Ashley of Stoke - British MP
- Michael Chorost - American writer
- Dorinda Cox - Australian politician
- Lou Ferrigno - bodybuilder and actor
- Don Garlits - Race car driver
- Tasha Ghouri - English TV personality
- Daisy Kent - American TV personality
- Kim Dong-hyun - South Korean Olympic bobsledder
- Mia le Roux - Miss South Africa 2024
- Huey Lewis - American actor and former singer-songwriter
- Rush Limbaugh - American conservative radio host
- Millicent Simmonds - American actress
- Heather Whitestone - 1995 Miss America
- Malala Yousafzai - Nobel peace prize recipient

== See also ==
- 3D printing
- Auditory brainstem response
- Auditory brainstem implant
- Bone-anchored hearing aid
- Bone conduction
- Brain implant
- Ear trumpet
- Electric Acoustic Stimulation
- Electrophonic hearing
- Neuroprosthetics
- Noise health effects
- Visual prosthesis
- Language deprivation § Deaf and Hard of Hearing Children
