= James Fujimoto =

Electrical engineer and ophthalmologist

James G. Fujimoto
- Born: Chicago, Illinois
- Citizenship: the United States
- Education: Massachusetts Institute of Technology
- Known for: optical coherence tomography;
- Awards: Rank Prize in Optoelectronics (2001); Zeiss Research Award (2011); Champalimaud Vision Award (2012); Frederic Ives Medal (2015); Russ Prize (2017)
- Scientific career
- Fields: Applied physics
- Workplaces: Massachusetts Institute of Technology

James G. Fujimoto is Elihu Thomson Professor of Electrical Engineering and Computer Science at the Massachusetts Institute of Technology (MIT), Principal Investigator at the Research Laboratory of Electronics, and a visiting professor of ophthalmology at Tufts University School of Medicine, Boston, Massachusetts.

He received his M.Sc. and Ph.D. from MIT in 1981 and 1984 respectively. He has been part of the MIT faculty since 1985 and is currently Elihu Thomson Professor of Electrical Engineering and Computer Science at MIT and Adjunct Professor of Ophthalmology at Tufts University School of Medicine. He contributed to the invention of optical coherence tomography. In addition to his work on OCT he has also contributed to the development of femtosecond lasers.

Professor Fujimoto was elected a member of the National Academy of Engineering in 2001. He is also a fellow of the American Physical Society, the National Academy of Sciences and the American Association for the Advancement of Science. He has published over 400 journal articles.

== Awards and honors ==
- 2001 Member of the National Academy of Engineering
- 2001 Fellow of the American Physical Society
- 2001 Rank Prize in Optoelectronics
- 2011 Zeiss Research Award
- 2012 Champalimaud Vision Award
- 2013 SPIE Britton Chance Biomedical Optics Award
- 2014 IEEE Photonics Award
- 2015 Frederic Ives Medal
- 2017 Russ Prize
- 2023 Lasker-DeBakey Clinical Medical Research Award
- 2023 National Medal of Technology and Innovation (2023)
- 2024 Honda Prize
- 2025 Inducted into the National Inventors Hall of Fame
- 2026 Clarivate Citation Laureate
