= Eric Arnott =

British ophthalmologist (1929–2011)

Eric John Arnott
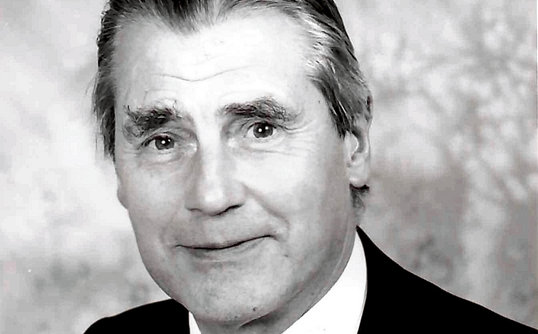
- Born: 12 June 1929
- Died: 1 December 2011 (aged 82)
- Occupation: Ophthalmic surgeon
- Known for: Advances in cataract surgery

Eric John Arnott (12 June 1929 – 1 December 2011) was a British ophthalmologist and surgeon who specialized in cataracts, a condition which in many parts of the world still remains the principal cause of blindness. He is known for inventing new surgical techniques for treatment of various ophthalmological disorders, and received professional awards for his contributions.

== Career ==
Arnott was educated at Harrow School (Elmfield) and Trinity College, Dublin where he was awarded the Surgical Prize in 1952; BA (Hons) 1953 and MB (Hons), BCh (Hons) and BAO (Hons) 1954. He gained his Diploma in Ophthalmology (DO) in 1956 and Fellowship to the Royal College of Surgeons (FRCS) in 1963.

Arnott's first ophthalmic appointment was as Houseman at the Royal Adelaide Hospital and Royal Victoria Eye and Ear Hospital, Dublin, following which he held early appointments at Moorfields Eye Hospital, London, and University College Hospital London, where he trained under Sir Stewart Duke-Elder and H. B. Stallard.

Whilst at Moorfields he worked with Sir Harold Ridley, the inventor of the intraocular lens; Arnott was inspired by Ridley's work on the intraocular lens and they later became lifelong friends.

After completing training at University College Hospital, Arnott was appointed as consultant initially to the Royal Eye Hospital and later, in 1965, to Charing Cross Hospital; then still in the Strand. In 1973 the hospital moved to its current site in Fulham, where Arnott was responsible for setting up the ophthalmic surgical services.

In 1974, Arnott and his wife Veronica organised the first Live International Ophthalmic Micro-Surgical Symposium in Charing Cross Hospital, where ten of the world's top eye surgeons performed live surgery, relayed to over 300 international delegates, courtesy of the BBC. This novel concept in advanced surgical teaching set a standard for future surgical conferences. He later organised two other live symposia with Professor Emanuel Rosen, with the objective of bringing new ideas in cataract surgery to a wider audience.

Arnott was known for his pioneering work in ophthalmology and many of today's top eye surgeons were trained by him whilst registrars at Charing Cross.

He retired from the NHS in 1994.

== Phacoemulsification ==
In 1968, whilst Secretary of the Ophthalmic Society of the United Kingdom he invited Dr Charles Kelman MD, the inventor of phacoemulsification ("phaco"), to address the Society. Kelman had found a method of removing the cataract through an incision of 3.5mm compared to the 12mm required for most surgery at the time. This meant that patients no longer had to remain in bed for two weeks after surgery with all movement restricted.

In 1971, Arnott visited the United States to attend one of Kelman's first courses. On his return, he privately raised the finance to buy the expensive equipment required for the procedure. When he started performing this new type of cataract operation, history indicates that it was not well received by his colleagues. Six years later Arnott was virtually alone in performing and teaching this procedure outside America.

Today, almost all cataract surgery is carried out using a variation of the technique that Arnott pioneered in the UK in the early seventies.

== Lens implantation ==
In 1974, influenced by Sir Harold Ridley's work on lens implantation, Arnott designed the Little-Arnott lens, which was manufactured by Rayners. This was one of the first intraocular lenses to be positioned behind the iris, the normal position of the natural lens. Previously, lenses were implanted in front of the iris, and many of them caused severe ocular problems. Arnott followed this up with several other designs before inventing "the totally encircling loop" lens which was manufactured under license by Alcon, Pharmacia and Smith & Nephew and others. Clinical data demonstrated that this lens maintained an excellent position within the eye and over 2 million were implanted worldwide during the 1980s and 1990s.

During the seventies, all of the lenses designed by Arnott were made of polymethyl methacrylate (PMMA). In 1981, Arnott and Richard Packard, his then senior registrar at Charing Cross Hospital, were the first to describe the use of a soft lens material, which could be folded to go through a small incision. In 1988 Arnott was the first surgeon to insert a bi-focal lens implant in Europe.

Following cataract removal, it used to be common for patients to require thick pebble glasses to be able to see. Nowadays, virtually all patients receive a lens implant following cataract surgery, avoiding the need for glasses.

== Other contributions ==
Arnott was also responsible for introducing other surgical techniques.

In 1966 he was amongst the first surgeons in the world to follow Dermot Pearce's use of the surgical microscope.

In 1967 he and Paddy Condon, his then senior registrar, used the first silicone implant for retinal detachment surgery.

In 1968 he modified the final approach to glaucoma surgery by making the opening into the anterior chamber through the clear cornea, as opposed to the previous dialysis approach.

In 1976 he and Jared Emery of Houston, Texas, invented the diamond tipped "spear headed" surgical knife for making the phaco incision and in 1978 he was the first surgeon to perform a combined phaco cataract and glaucoma operation.

Arnott was very early in recognising the new trend of laser refractive surgery to correct myopia (shortsightedness). He acquired one of the first excimer lasers, which he located in Cromwell Hospital in 1991, where his private practice was based. In 1992 he was the first person in the UK to perform LASIK.

In 2000 Arnott received an award from the International Intra-Ocular Implant Club - the IIIC Medal, at the club's annual autumn meeting in Brussels, Belgium.

== Charity work ==
In 1982 he reduced his work in the NHS (from maximum part-time) to four sessions a week and began concentrating on charitable work at the Royal Masonic Hospital, London, (where he remained an honorary consultant until 1994) and international teaching commitments.

Over the course of his career, Arnott lectured and performed live surgery throughout the world, paying particular attention to the Asian and African continents where cataracts are most prevalent.

In 1984 he was one of the first surgeons to demonstrate phaco surgery and lens implantation in India and in 1991 he received a special award from the Asian branch of the Royal National Institute for the Blind for "outstanding support" to blind Asians in London and India. The same award was presented a year later to his son Stephen, who managed Arnott's private practice. In 1996, Arnott was invited to officially open the first meeting of the Indian Academy of Ophthalmology, and in 1998 he was made an honorary visiting Professor at Indore University.

After Arnott's retirement in 1999, with the help of his wife Veronica and son Stephen, he raised funds to fund and equip a mobile operating theatre to perform modern eye surgery in remote Indian villages. This project was undertaken in conjunction with the Sathya Sai Institute.

Along with Dr G Chandra, he established the charity organisation 'Balrampur Hospital Foundation UK' in 2007 and served as a trustee and its president.

== Medical societies ==
Arnott was a member of many international ophthalmic societies and was the founder President of the European Society for Phaco and Laser Surgery (1986–89), Secretary of the Ophthalmic Society of the United Kingdom (1967 – 1968), President of the Chelsea Clinical Society (1985) and President of the International Association of Ocular Surgeons (1983).

He was also one of the original founder members of the American Society of Cataract and Refractive Surgery.

In 2007 Arnott received the Honoured Guest award from the ASCRS for his services to ophthalmology.

== Publications ==
He wrote over 40 published scientific articles for British and foreign ophthalmic journals on strabismus surgery, congenital abnormalities, cataract extraction, Phaco-emulsification and intra-ocular lenses.

Between 1992 and 1997 he wrote a regular chapter on the latest ophthalmic advances for the annual Royal College of General Practitioners Reference Book

Arnott was co-author of the 1983 textbook Extra-capsular Cataract Surgery and contributed specialist chapters to many other medical books including Emergency Surgery by H Dudley, Intra-ocular Lens Implantation by Rosen et al., Current Perspectives in Ophthalmic Surgery by Easty et al., and A Colour Atlas of Lens Implantation by Percival.

Arnott, with assistance from his son Stephen, wrote and published A New Beginning in Sight in September 2006, chronicling the development of modern cataract and refractive surgery.

== Personal life ==
Arnott was born in Sunningdale, Berkshire, the second son of Sir Robert Arnott Bt. and Cynthia Amelia (née James). His family were notable Anglo-Irish philanthropists who owned, amongst other things, Arnotts department store, the Irish Times, and the Phoenix Park Racecourse.

He was married to Veronica (née Langué) from 1960 until her death in 2011 and had two sons, Stephen John 1962, Robert Laureston John 1971 and one daughter Tatiana Amelia 1963.

Until 2001 he remained fit by swimming a mile every morning and in 1974 he successfully completed a challenge to swim from the infamous Alcatraz Island to the shore of San Francisco.

When Arnott finally retired at the age of 70 years, he bought a retirement cottage in Cornwall in Mounts Bay overlooking the Atlantic Ocean from where he wrote his memoirs "A New Beginning in Sight" before his death 1 December 2011.

== See also ==
- Harold Ridley
- IIIC
- David J. Apple
