= Osteo-odonto-keratoprosthesis =

Medical procedure for the eye

- Specialty: Ophthalmology

Osteo-odonto-keratoprosthesis (OOKP), also known as "tooth in eye" surgery, is a medical procedure to restore vision in the most severe cases of corneal and ocular surface patients. It includes removal of a tooth from the patient or a donor.

After removal, a longitudinal lamina is cut from the tooth and a hole is drilled perpendicular to the lamina. The hole is then fitted with a cylindrical lens. The lamina is grown in the patients' cheek for a period of months and then is implanted upon the eye.

The procedure was pioneered by the Italian ophthalmic surgeon, professor Benedetto Strampelli in the early 1960s. Strampelli was a founder-member of the International Intra-Ocular Implant Club (IIIC) in 1966.

== Medical uses ==
An operation to graft the OOKP is undertaken in severe pemphigoid, chemical burns, Stevens–Johnson syndrome, trachoma, Lyell syndrome and multiple corneal graft failure.

There is a significant risk of anatomical failure of lamina in the long term, estimated at 19% in a small study, with the main risks being laminar resorption, particularly in allografts, and glaucoma.

Another, bigger study comparing OOKP with the lesser known osteo-keratoprosthesis (OKP) in 145 and 82 patients and follow-up terms up to 10 years yielded the following statistics:

- 10-year anatomical survival: 66% for OOKP and 47% for OKP
- 2-year functional survival (visual acuity better than 1.30 logMAR or 20/400 Snellen): 63% for OOKP and 49% for OKP
- 10-year functional survival (visual acuity better than 1.30 logMAR or 20/400 Snellen): 38% for OOKP and 17% for OKP

Another long-term study of 181 patients puts the chances of retaining an intact OOKP after 18 years at 85%.

In 2022, a retrospective study conducted on 82 eyes with OOKP using original Strampelli technique, showed an anatomical survival of 94% up to 30 years of follow-up. The same study also reported a visual acuity better than 1.00 logMAR (or 20/200 Snellen) at 10 years in 81% of the eyes, and a visual acuity of 1.21 logMAR (or 20/324 Snellen) at 30 years.

== Procedure ==
OOKP is a two-stage operation:

Stage 1 of the surgery involves five separate procedures:

1. The eye is opened up and the entire inner surface of the eyelids, corneal surface and all scar tissue is removed
2. Inner mucosal lining of the cheek is transplanted onto the new surface of the eye
3. A canine or premolar tooth and part of the adjacent bone and ligaments are removed
4. A bolt-shaped structure is fashioned from the tooth-bone complex which is fitted with a plastic optical cylinder
5. The tooth-bone-cylinder complex is implanted into the patient's cheek to grow a new blood supply

Stage 2 (about 4 months later) involves two separate procedures:

1. The cheek mucosal lining over the eye is opened and the inner contents of the eye are removed
2. The tooth-bone-cylinder complex is removed from the cheek and inserted into the eye, the mucosal cheek lining is replaced over the implant.

At the end of the procedure, light can now enter through the plastic cylinder, and the patient is able to see through this cylinder with good vision.

== History ==
The procedure was pioneered by the Italian ophthalmic surgeon Professor Benedetto Strampelli in Rome in the early 1960s.

The son of the geneticist and agronomist Nazareno Strampelli, Benedetto Strampelli held the chair of ophthalmic surgery at Rome's Ospedale di San Giovanni in Laterano where he was one of the first surgeons in Italy to transplant cornea. In 1953 he was the first Italian to implant intraocular lenses which were manufactured to his own design by Rayners in UK. Strampelli was a founder-member with Harold Ridley and Peter Choyce of the International Intra-Ocular Implant Club (IIIC) in 1966.

== See also ==
- Eye surgery
- Refractive surgery
