= Svyatoslav Fyodorov =

Russian physician (1927–2000)

- Святослав Фёдоров
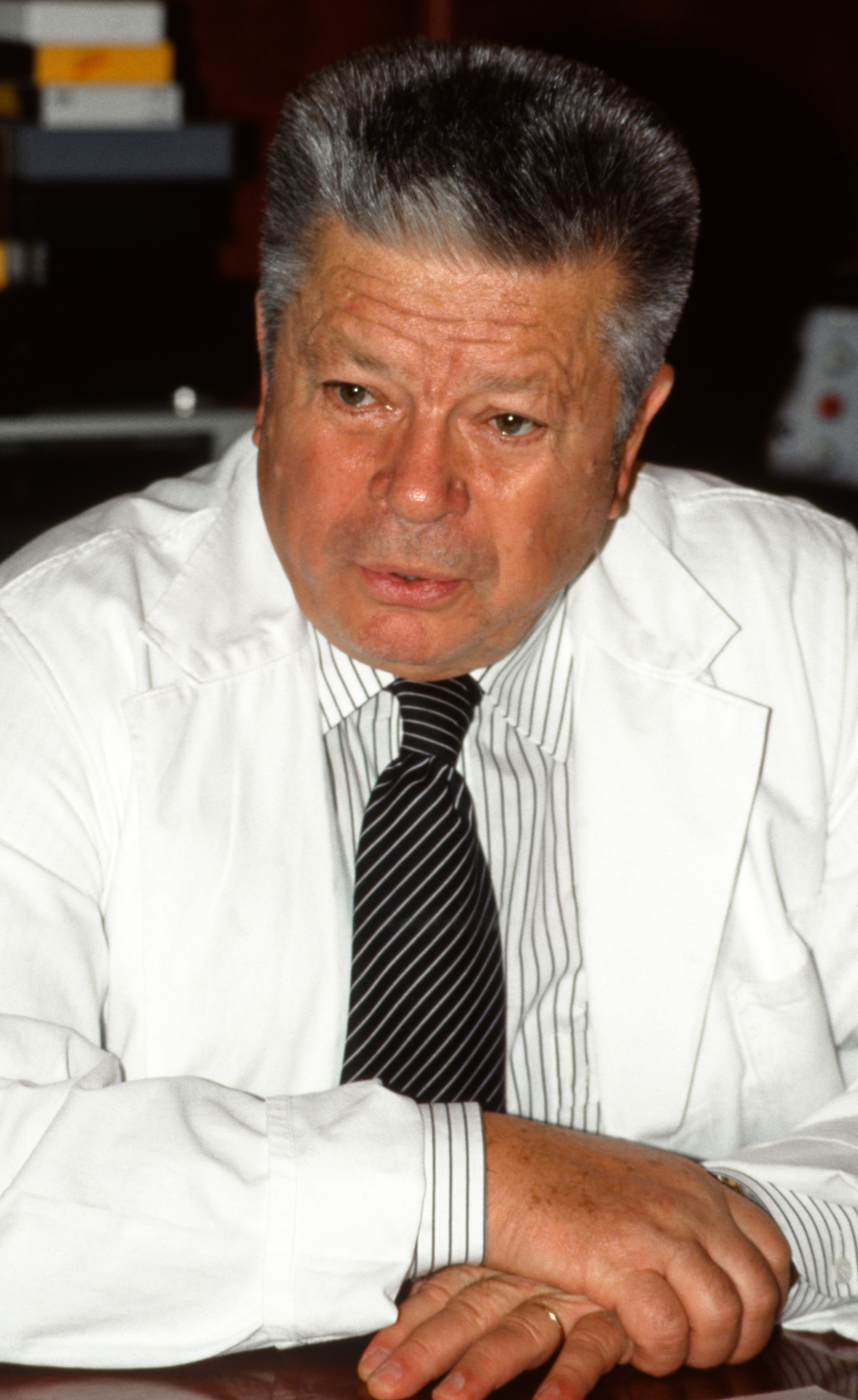
- Fyodorov in 1992
- Born: 8 August 1927; Proskurov, Ukrainian SSR, Soviet Union
- Died: 2 June 2000 (aged 72); Moscow, Russia
- Education: Rostov Medical Institute
- Known for: Creating radial keratotomy, scleroplasty and intraocular lens replacement
- Medical career
- Profession: Surgeon and politician
- Institutions: Fyodorov Eye Microsurgery Complex
- Sub-specialties: Ophthalmology, eye surgery
- Awards: Lomonosov Gold Medal (1986)

Svyatoslav Nikolayevich Fyodorov (Russian: Святослав Николаевич Фёдоров; 8 August 1927 – 2 June 2000) was a Russian ophthalmologist, politician, professor, full member of the Russian Academy of Sciences and Russian Academy of Medical Sciences. He is considered to be a pioneer of refractive surgery. He was also one of the candidates in the 1996 Russian presidential election, running as a member of the Party of Workers' Self-Government.

== Life and career ==
Fyodorov was born in Proskurov, Ukrainian SSR (now Khmelnytskyi, Ukraine), to ethnic Russian parents. Fyodorov graduated from Rostov Medical Institute in Rostov on Don, then worked as a practicing ophthalmologist in a small town in Rostov Oblast.

=== Cataract surgery ===
In the 1960s he studied the pioneering work of the English ophthalmic surgeon Sir Harold Ridley, the inventor of the intraocular lens (IOL). Fyodorov began to use Ridley's intraocular lenses in his treatment of cataract. At first he used lenses manufactured by the Rayner company in England but he quickly moved to have his lenses manufactured inside the Soviet Union.

=== Refractive surgery ===
In the 1970s he developed the surgical technique he is most famous for, the radial keratotomy, to change the shape of the cornea and cure myopia. In 1980 he became the head of the Moscow Research Institute of Eye Microsurgery. Then in 1986, he developed an assembly line process with 8 patients on tables that spin into position for one of 5 surgeons to complete their portion of the surgery. Fyodorov said he invented the process after the Soviet government agreed to pay him on a per-surgery basis. His clinic performed glaucoma and cataract surgery, and lens implementation, in addition to radial keratomy in this manner. In 1986, Fyodorov designed the first posterior chamber phakic IOL in the "collar-button" or "mushroom" configuration and manufactured the pIOL from silicone. In 1988 he founded the Fyodorov Eye Microsurgery Complex. In 1994 he endorsed and wrote the foreword to the American textbook (Radial and Astigmatic Keratotomy) by Dr. Spencer Thornton in which Thornton taught a surgical technique derived from but markedly different from the Fyorodov technique.

== Politics ==
In the 1980s through the early 1990s, Fyodorov called for repeal of the Soviet Union's one-party system while still a member of the Communist Party.

Fyodorov was a member of the Congress of People's Deputies from 1989 to 1991.

In 1991 he rejected an offer by Boris Yeltsin to become Russia's premier.

Considered one of the Soviet Union's first highly successful practicing capitalists, he was a proponent for the denationalization of the economy. On June 12, 1991, the day of Russia's inaugural presidential election, Fyodorov told state media that he believed that Russia's revival hinged on the "de-statization" of property. Fyodorov argued that, "If in the US the main means of production are concentrated in the hands of 13% of the population", then Russia should distribute ownership of those resources among 50-60% of its population through the creation of "people's enterprises" and joint-stock companies. "We have the biggest scientific community in the world, where the intellectual component constitutes 90% of industrial costs. This factor plus our natural resources and territory give us a chance, in the course of one generation, to leave behind the US and, perhaps, Japan," he said.

In 1992 he became the co-chairman of the Party of Economic Freedom, an early liberal party.

Fyodorov was elected to the lower house of the Russian parliament, the State Duma, in 1995, the chairman of his own small party.

Considered to be on the center-left of the Russian political spectrum, Fyodorov was the founder and leader of the Party of Workers' Self-Government, which was one of the most influential social-democratic movements in Russia during the 1990s.

In 1994 Fyodorov had described his political objective by stating, "I want peasants to own farms, workers to own factories, physicians to own clinics, and everyone to pay a 30% tax, and the rest is theirs."

=== Presidential campaign ===
Fyodorov ran as the candidate of the Party of Workers' Self-Government in the 1996 Russian presidential election

As a presidential candidate, Fyodorov advocated for the mass creation of joint stock companies to guarantee workers a share of profits and allow them to actively participate in management of their companies. He dubbed this concept "democratic capitalism" or "popular socialism". Fyodorov advocated for economic freedom, simple and moderate taxation, stimulation of production, and a ban on exports of most raw materials. Fyodorov promised that his policies would double the nation's GDP within five years. Fyodorov proclaimed to draw inspiration in his politics from both Ross Perot and Deng Xiaoping.

Up until early May, Fyodorov unsuccessfully attempted to negotiate the creation of a third force coalition, with negotiations largely centering on a coalition between him and fellow candidates Yavlinsky and Lebed.

== Death ==
Returning from an academic conference in 2000, Fyodorov died in a crash of his clinic's four-seater helicopter on the outskirts of Moscow.

== Reception and legacy ==
In 2013, a profile of Fyodorov was included in a book called Saving Sight: An eye surgeon's look at life behind the mask and the heroes who changed the way we see, by Andrew Lam, M.D.

== See also ==
- Harold Ridley (ophthalmologist)
- David J. Apple
