= Multifocal lens =

Multifocal lens may refer to:

- Progressive lens, used in eyeglasses
- Multifocal intraocular lens
- Multifocal diffractive lens, a diffractive optical element used with lasers
