= Roberto Zaldívar =

Argentine doctor

Roberto Zaldivar
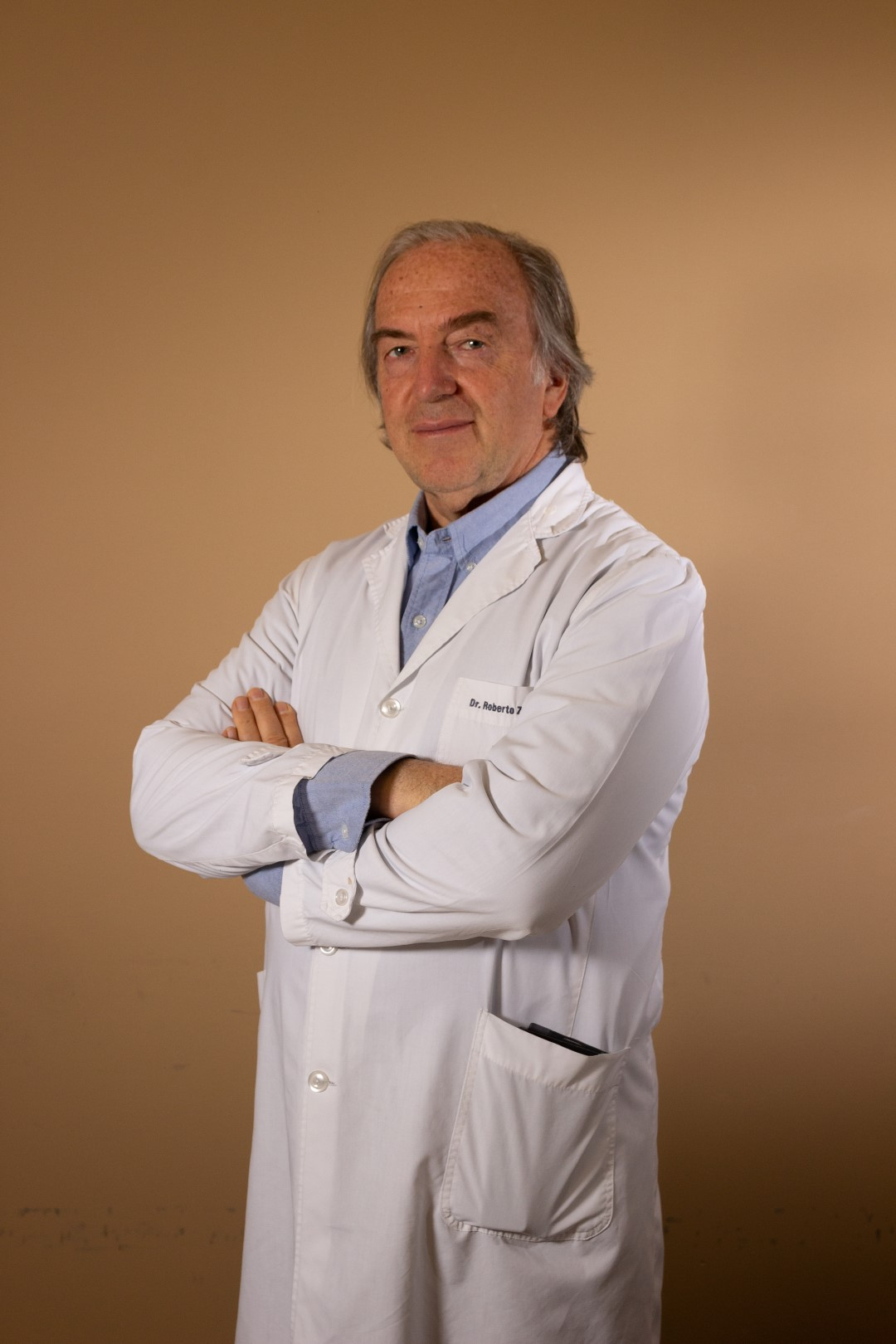
- Born: May 27, 1957 (age 68); New Haven, Connecticut, U.S.
- Education: National University of Cuyo
- Occupation: Ophthalmologist
- Organization: Instituto Zaldivar
- Known for: Bioptics, phakic intraocular lens (ICL)
- Spouse: Stella Gaibazzi
- Children: Mercedes Zaldivar, Roger Zaldivar
- Website: www.institutozaldivar.com

Roberto Zaldivar (born May 27, 1957) is an Argentine doctor of ophthalmology and a refractive surgeon. He is credited with several breakthroughs in the use of laser to correct visual impairments. Zaldivar is credited for a technique called bioptics, a term he introduced. He is the president of the Instituto Zaldivar in Argentina, and the founder and first president of the Argentine Society of Cataract and Refractive and Corneal Surgery. He also introduced excimer laser technology to Latin America, and was the first in the world to implant the first collamer implantable lens in a patient, for which he has been considered a pioneer of phakic intraocular lenses (ICL).

== Career ==
His father was Roger Eleazar Zaldivar, an ophthalmologist who founded the first cornea bank in Argentina and in 1959 inaugurated the Zaldivar Institute in the city of Mendoza, where the first corneal transplants in that country were performed. He was the first to bring and operate with a ruby laser in South America in 1961 and was president of the Argentine Council of Ophthalmology between 1972 and 1974. Roberto was born in New Haven, Connecticut, while his father was pursuing a master's degree at Yale.

Roger Eleazar Zaldivar was the dean of the Faculty of Medicine of the National University of Cuyo based in Mendoza, where Roberto studied Medicine between the ages of 16 and 22. In 1983, he obtained Research to Prevent Blindness Scholarship, and that same year he completed a subspecialty in the anterior segment of eyeball in Boston, Massachusetts. There, he attended to the Kennedy family, Arab sheikhs, and the presidents of the Philippines, Ferdinand Marcos, and his opponent, Corazon Aquino.

In 1985, he returned to Mendoza to work with his father at the Instituto Zaldivar in the anterior segment, including refractive surgery and cataract surgery. In 1992, he became the second surgeon in the world to install and use the combined Excimer-Holmium laser equipment for myopia and hyperopia operations.

On September 22, 1993, he was the first ophthalmologist in the world to perform surgery with phakic intraocular lenses (ICL), which correct refractive errors such as myopia, hyperopia, and astigmatism.

In 1996, he created a technique called "bioptics" which consists of combining the use of phakic intraocular lenses with laser surgery. This development earned him the Innovators Lecture award in 2007, and he was the first Spanish-speaking physician to receive it. Bioptics was considered by the International Society of Refractive Surgery, the German Ophthalmological Society, and the American Academy of Ophthalmology as one of the 17 innovations that marked a milestone in ophthalmology worldwide.

Roberto Zaldivar was the first president of the Argentine Association of Refractive and Corneal Surgeons and of the International Intra-Ocular Implant Club (IIIC), the American Academy of Ophthalmology, the International Society of Keratorefractive Surgery, and the American Society of Cataract and Refractive Surgery.

Throughout his career, Zaldivar has attended to renowned figures, such as the actresses Susana Giménez and Graciela Borges; the former president of Argentina, Mauricio Macri; the journalist Bernardo Neustadt; the film director Juan José Campanella; the soccer players Diego Maradona, Enzo Francescoli, and Enzo Fernández; and the actors Ricardo Darín, Guillermo Francella, and Brad Pitt.

In 1996, he opened a branch of the Instituto Zaldivar in Buenos Aires and in 2002 in Asunción, Paraguay. In 1990, he formed the Zaldivar Foundation, which provides support to patients without resources.

== Prizes and awards ==
In 1998, he was the first non-resident specialist in the United States to receive the Lans Lecture award, granted by the International Society of Refractive Surgery.

In 1999, he was distinguished by the Ophthalmological Society of South Africa with the Epstein Lecture Award.

In 2002, he was recognized for his contributions to refractive surgery with the Robert Coles Memorial Lecture from the New York Academy of Medicine, while in 2007, the International Congress of German Ophthalmic Surgeons awarded him the Innovators Lecture.

In 2005, the Argentine Senate awarded him the Domingo Faustino Sarmiento Honorary Mention, which distinguishes entrepreneurs who stand out for their work for the good of the community.

In 2010, he received the Jan Worst Medal Lecture from the International Intra-Ocular Implant Club (IIIC) of the United States. Between 2016 and 2018, Zaldivar was president of that institution.

In 2012, he obtained the Rayner Medal Lecture from the United Kingdom and Ireland Society of Cataract and Refractive Surgeons. In 2014, he won a Gold Medal from the Spanish Society of Implant-Refractive Ocular Surgery. In 2017, he received the Benedetto Strampelli Medal from the Italian Ophthalmological Society and the Gold Medal from the Indian Intra-ocular Implant and Refractive Surgery.

In 2021, the executive committee of the Argentine Council of Ophthalmology awarded him the Lifetime Achievement Medal. The following year, he was the first foreigner to be recognized by the American Society of Cataract and Refractive Surgery with the Steinert Refractive Lecture. Also, the Italian Ophthalmological Society awarded him the Innovator Medal Lecture.

In 2024, he was recognized for the third time as one of the 100 most influential ophthalmologists in the world by the English magazine The Ophthalmologist. He had already been included in that list in 2019 and 2020.

In July 2024, he and his son Roger Zaldivar received the Visionary Award from the American-European Congress of Ophthalmic Surgery (AECOS) for their work in the development of ICL.

== Personal life ==
Roberto Zaldivar is married to Stella Gaibazzi. His daughter, Mercedes Zaldivar, is a lawyer, while his son Roger Zaldivar is also an ophthalmologist and is the medical director of the Instituto Zaldivar.
