= Gordon Cleaver =

British WWII flying ace

Gordon Neil Spencer Cleaver
- Born: 27 April 1910; Stanmore, Middlesex, England
- Died: 24 December 1994 (aged 84)
- Military career
- Allegiance: United Kingdom
- Branch: Royal Air Force
- Service years: 1937–1943
- Rank: Squadron Leader
- Nickname: Mouse
- Service number: 90135
- Unit: No. 601 Squadron RAF
- Conflicts: Second World War: Battle of Britain
- Awards: Distinguished Flying Cross

Gordon Neil Spencer 'Mouse' Cleaver, DFC (27 April 1910 – 24 December 1994) was a Royal Air Force fighter pilot and flying ace (with 7 confirmed "kills") during the Battle of Britain in the Second World War. After the war his injuries played a role in developing artificial lenses to restore sight.

== Early life ==
Gordon Cleaver was born in Stanmore, Middlesex and was educated at Harrow School. Cleaver was the inaugural winner of the Hahnenkammrennen Combined in 1931, and for 91 years was the only British skier to have won at Kitzbühel. In the same race was Roger Bushell, of Great Escape fame, who finished in 14th place.

== Air Force career ==
Cleaver joined the Auxiliary Air Force in 1937, serving with No. 601 Squadron RAF, also known as "The Millionaires' Squadron".

Cleaver went with the squadron to Merville, France on 16 May 1940. On 18 May, Cleaver, with F/L Archibald Hope, brought down a Do 17 of 2/KG 76 west of Mons, the crew being captured. The next day, Cleaver's Hurricane was hit by debris from a He 111 that attacked over Douai and he force-landed near Lille. 601 Squadron was then transferred back to the UK.

On 27 May, he claimed two Bf 110s destroyed over Dunkirk. Cleaver next claimed a Ju 87 destroyed and a He 111 'probable' on 11 July, a Bf 109 destroyed on 26 July, a Bf 109 and a Bf 110 both probables on 11 August and a Bf 110 probably destroyed on 13 August.

On 15 August 1940, Cleaver was shot down during combat over Winchester, not wearing goggles. The canopy of his Hurricane was hit by cannon shells and its Perspex fragments shattered into his face and both eyes. Cleaver baled out and landed by parachute near Lower Upham outside Southampton. On arrival at Salisbury Hospital, it was discovered that he had been blinded in his right eye and had seriously reduced vision in the left, ending his flying career.

Cleaver was awarded the Distinguished Flying Cross

Flying Officer Gordon Neil Spencer CLEAVER (90135), Auxiliary Air Force.
This officer has been engaged on operational flying since December, 1939. He participated in numerous offensive patrols during operations in France and the Dunkirk evacuation. Flying Officer Cleaver has now destroyed seven enemy aircraft and possibly another two. In August, 1940, whilst his base was being subjected to intense bombing, he led his- section with great determination and courage and after destroying one of the attacking aircraft he was severely wounded in both eyes. Despite this, he refused to abandon his aircraft and effected a successful landing. He has displayed great determination and devotion to duty.

Despite his injuries, Cleaver was able to remain in the RAF. He officially transferred to the Administrative Branch on 27 May 1941. He was released on medical grounds from the RAF on 9 November 1943, retaining the rank of squadron leader.

== List of air victories ==
| Victory No. | Date | Squadron | Enemy aircraft | Notes |
|---|---|---|---|---|
| 1. | 18 May 1940 | No. 601 Squadron | Dornier Do 17 | Mons |
| 2 & 3 | 28 June 1940 | No. 601 Squadron | Two Messerschmitt Me 110s | Dunkirk |
| 4 | 11 July 1940 | No. 601 Squadron | Junkers Ju 87 (& probable Heinkel He 111) | |
| 5 | 26 July 1940 | No. 601 Squadron | Messerschmitt Bf 109 | |
| 6 & 7 | 11 August 1940 | No. 601 Squadron | Messerschmitt Bf 109 & Messerschmitt Me 110 | |
| 8 | 13 August 1940 | No. 601 Squadron | Messerschmitt Me 110 | |

== Eye operations and later life ==
Following his injuries on 15 August 1940, Cleaver had 18 operations on his eyes and face at several hospitals in the South of England. He had flown that sortie without airman's goggles, leaving his face and eyes unprotected from the shards of metal and Perspex from the Hurricane canopy. He recovered some sight in one eye but was blinded in the other. During the course of this treatment ophthalmologist Harold Ridley noticed that the Perspex in Cleaver's eyes caused no inflammation. After the war, Ridley used this observation to inform his work on the development of the intraocular lens. He requested the Rayner company to manufacture a lens from ICI Perspex. The first intraocular lens implant surgery performed by Harold Ridley in 1949 used a lens made of ICI Perspex CQ (Clinical Quality).

Later in life, Cleaver developed cataract in his remaining eye. In the 1980s, he had the cataract removed by English surgeon Eric Arnott and received an intraocular lens: his sight was restored thanks to a medical device that had been developed after observation on his eyes 40 years earlier. His new lens was made of similar material to the Perspex which had entered his eyes in 1940.

== Legacy ==
The organizers of Hahnenkamm named a cup after Cleaver, first presented in 2006.

In 2013, a portrayal of Cleaver's final dogfight and his connection to Harold Ridley's invention of the artificial intraocular lens were highlighted in a book called Saving Sight: An eye surgeon's look at life behind the mask and the heroes who changed the way we see, by Andrew Lam, M.D.

== Film and TV ==
On 6 January 2016, during the television programme The One Show on BBC 1, a short film was shown about the link between Gordon Cleaver and Sir Harold Ridley. Using archive film and photographic material and an interview with Sir Harold's son Nicholas Ridley, the Chairman of the Ridley Eye Foundation, Michael Mosley reported on the "Eureka moment" that led to the invention of the intraocular lens. The film was made by ICON FILMS, based in Bristol, England.
