= Vincenz Fukala =

Polish ophthalmologist (1847–1911)

- Wincenty Fukała
- Born: January 2, 1847; Zolkiew, Kingdom of Galicia and Lodomeria
- Died: October 27, 1911 (aged 64); Vienna
- Known for: Clear lens extraction
- Scientific career
- Fields: ophthalmology

Vincenz Fukala (January 2, 1847 – October 27, 1911) was a Polish ophthalmologist and ophthalmology historian better known for early works on Clear lens extraction, the surgical removal of natural lens of the eye, as a treatment of high myopia. He also developed successful techniques for the treatment of ectropion.

== Biography ==
Vincenz Fukala aka Wincenty Fukała was born into a Polish family in present-day Zhovkva in Ukraine on January 2, 1847.

Fukala died on October 27, 1911, at Vienna.

== Career ==
Studying medicine in University of Vienna, Fukala specialized in ophthalmology under Austrian ophthalmologist Carl Ferdinand von Arlt. After working as an ophthalmologist in Plzeň and Karlovy Vary in Bohemia for five years from 1889, he returned to Vienna in 1895. Fukala traveled to Egypt in 1872 to study trachoma, and to the United States in 1891 and 1892 to study scrofulous eye disease.

== Contributions ==
Fukala is better known for early works on Clear lens extraction, the surgical removal of natural lens of the eye, as a treatment of high myopia. His researches in clear lens extraction later led to the development of two cornea-based refractive surgeries, keratomileusis and epikeratophakia.

Other than clear lens extraction technique for myopia, Fucala developed highly successful techniques for the treatment of ectropion, an eyelid condition caused by blepharitis, trachoma, or shallow eye sockets following enucleation. In the treatment of glaucoma, he recommended that when one eye becomes blind due to glaucoma, to prevent glaucoma and save vision in other eye, iridectomy should be performed in the other eye also.

He was also an expert on ancient European texts and the history of Arabian ophthalmology.

=== Fukala's operation ===
Fucala advised clear lens extraction in young high myopic (−13 diopters or more) patients with poor vision and inability to work. He removed the lens, even at low power (−10 D), in children between five and ten years of age with progressive myopia who were prone to increasing levels of myopia.

After the surgery, which consisted of dissection of the clear lens and subsequent needle removal of the swollen lens material, most of his patients regained good vision. After successful reports of Fukala's surgical method, ophthalmologists from many European countries performed this operation to treat highly myopic patients.

Although he had many success history, his surgical methods were opposed by his contemporaries, Franciscus Donders, Ernst Fuchs, von Graefe, etc. On April 3, 1887, when he performed his first clear lens surgery and then gave his first lecture on it, criticizing that, Fuchs said that it could even be dangerous under certain circumstances. At an ophthalmology meeting in Edinburgh in 1894, Donders even argued that his method would be a "punishable presumption" and that patients would lose their accommodation completely, however, Fukala noted these arguments were just theoretical.

In the early 20th century, practice of Fucala's method declined due to the fear of complications, but at the end of the century, clear lens excision was resumed in high myopes as the risk of complications decreased significantly. After the advancements in surgical techniques and invention of intraocular lens, unlike leaving the eye without lens as Fukula did earlier, usually a monofocal or multifocal intraocular lens is placed inside the eye after operations now.
