= Bioptics =

Bioptics may refer to:

- Bioptics (device), head-mounted eyeglasses of extreme magnification, which look somewhat similar to binoculars or which are mounted on existing glasses, to improve the distance vision of those with extreme vision impairment, most commonly those with albinism. Also known as a bioptic telescope.
- Bioptics (surgery), a combinatorial vision-correction surgical technique, pioneered by Roberto Zaldívar, in which refractive error is treated on both the lenticular and corneal optical planes.
