= OKP =

OKP may refer to:

- Okayplayer
- OK Poland Local Government Coalition (OK Poland, OKP)
- Osteo-keratoprosthesis, see Osteo-odonto-keratoprosthesis
- Obligatorische Krankenpflegeversicherung, see Healthcare in Liechtenstein
- Obywatelski Klub Parlamentarny, see Solidarity Citizens' Committee
