= Raymond Stein =

Canadian ophthalmologist

Raymond Mark Stein is a Canadian ophthalmologist, researcher, and author recognized for his expertise in refractive, corneal, and cataract surgery. He serves as the Medical Director of the Bochner Eye Institute in Toronto and is a Professor of Ophthalmology and Vision Sciences at the University of Toronto. Stein is known for his work on laser vision correction, corneal crosslinking, topography-guided photorefractive keratectomy (PRK), and femtosecond cataract surgery.

== Education ==
Stein received his BA after attending Wharton School, University of Pennsylvania and McMaster University and was eventually designated a Benjamin Franklin Scholar. He then received his M.D. degree in 1982 from the University of Toronto Medical School, which was followed by ophthalmology residency at Mayo Clinic and fellowship training in cornea and external diseases at Wills Eye Hospital, Thomas Jefferson University. Stein was a member of the United States’ National Board of Medical Examiners, a diplomate of the American Board of Ophthalmology (DABO) and a Fellow of the Royal College of Physicians and Surgeons of Canada (FRCSC).

== Career ==
Stein's primary work has been in laser vision correction, including the techniques of photorefractive keratectomy, LASIK, refractive lens exchange, cataract surgery, and implantable contact lenses. He has also done extensive research in corneal crosslinking and topography-guided PRK for keratoconus, procedures he introduced into Canada in 2008.

Stein is Professor of Ophthalmology and Vision Sciences at University of Toronto and Medical Director of the Bochner Eye Institute in Toronto, Canada. He was trained by the inventor of the excimer laser, Dr Steven Trokel, in 1991 and has performed more than 150,000 vision-correction procedures.

He was chosen to serve as the chief eye surgeon for the W Network’s television show Style By Jury, and has performed surgery on over 25 episodes. He has also appeared as a guest on the Marilyn Denis Show talking about laser eye surgery.

He was described in a profile in Post City Magazines as "one of Canada’s top eye surgeons".

In addition to serving as the medical director of the Bochner Eye Institute, Stein served as chief of ophthalmology at the Scarborough Hospital in Toronto, as well as the cornea consultant at the Mount Sinai Hospital, Toronto. Stein's philanthropic activities include serving on the board of directors of the Foundation of Fighting Blindness, raising funds for Comic Vision for degenerative eye diseases and volunteer surgeon on numerous international missions.

Stein is an active member of numerous professional organizations, including the American Academy of Ophthalmology, the American Society of Cataract and Refractive Surgery, the Canadian Ophthalmological Society, the Canadian Society of Cataract & Refractive Surgery, the Contact Lens Association of Ophthalmologists, the International Intraocular Implant Club, the International Society of Refractive Surgery, the Ontario Medical Association, and the World College of Refractive Surgery.

At the University of Toronto, he progressed from Lecturer to Professor of Ophthalmology and Vision Sciences. He also served as Chief of Ophthalmology at Scarborough General Hospital from 1994 to 2016. Over his career, Stein has performed over 200,000 surgical procedures, including LASIK, PRK, phakic implants, and laser-assisted cataract surgery. He was among the first North American surgeons to use the excimer laser for therapeutic and refractive treatments in the early 1990s, contributing to the development of surgical techniques and nomograms that enhanced uncorrected vision and safety. His clinical innovations also include laser cataract surgery and topography-guided PRK combined with corneal collagen crosslinking (CXL).

== Research contributions ==
Stein’s research has focused on improving refractive, corneal, and cataract surgery while developing innovative educational tools for ophthalmologists, medical students, residents, family doctors, and ophthalmic assistants.

Stein has contributed to refractive surgery techniques for myopia, hyperopia, astigmatism, and presbyopia, especially in regions lacking access to corrective eyewear. He was among the first surgeons to perform excimer laser treatments for therapeutic and refractive purposes in North America, participating in early clinical trials that informed laser techniques such as PRK, LASIK, phototherapeutic keratectomy, bitoric laser ablation, epi-LASIK, and pain management strategies.

In recent years, Stein’s research has focused on improving vision in patients with keratoconus. He was an early North American evaluator of corneal collagen crosslinking (CXL) and pioneered the combination of topography-guided PRK with CXL to reduce irregular astigmatism and improve visual acuity. His collaborative clinical studies on CXL techniques have been published in leading ophthalmology journals, including the Journal of Cataract and Refractive Surgery and the American Journal of Ophthalmology.

In 2025, he pioneered a new technique for corneal crosslinking referred to as Bochner Precision CXL that removes 83% less epithelial cells, and allows for a more rapid and comfortable visual recovery, reduced chance of corneal haze, and improves biomechanical strength.

Stein has also significantly contributed to ophthalmic education, serving as the principal author and editor of The Ophthalmic Assistant, a globally recognized textbook now in its 11th edition, with a 12th edition forthcoming. He authored Management of Ocular Emergencies, now in its 6th edition, a textbook widely distributed to medical students, primary care doctors, emergency physicians, optometrists, and ophthalmologists.

== Personal life ==
He was a competitive tennis player who was ranked #4 in mens open tennis in Ontario, and played for both the University of Pennsylvania and University of Toronto. He was inducted in to the University of Toronto's Sports Hall of Fame in 2024.

Stein is married to Nancy Viner, and they have three children, Rebecca, Emma, and Maxwell.
