= Tadini (ophthalmologist) =

18th-century Italian ophthalmologist

Felice Tadini
- Born: 18th century Bologna, Italy
- Known for: artificial lenses
- Scientific career
- Fields: ophthalmologist

Felice Tadini was an Italian itinerant ophthalmologist from Bologna who was active between 1757 and 1793.

Advertisements in old newspapers testify to the fact that he performed eye operations in many towns in Europe, including Lübeck and Ghent. Between 1757 and 1759, Tadini's practice in Northern Europe seemed to emphasize general surgery more than ophthalmology, but he was called to account before medical authorities in Erfurt and Copenhagen. Beginning in 1760 in Hamburg, Tadini wrote that he performed cataract extractions through a method of his own invention, and he emphasized his ophthalmic practice for the remainder of his career. Tadini was the earliest ophthalmologist who performed cataract extractions (as opposed to the older technique of cataract couching) who has been identified who practiced in Russia (Saint Petersburg in 1760), Vilnius, Lithuania (1761), Constantinople (1766), and Spain (Barcelona and Madrid in 1768). On 3 March 1764, Tadini was permitted to kiss the feet of Pope Clement XIII in Rome. In Constantinople, Tadini operated on Esma Sultan in 1766. Tadini practiced in Barcelona in April and May 1968, and then in Madrid in July 1768. Tadini and Giacomo Casanova were both at the Spanish court in July 1768, and given that Casanova later wrote about Tadini, they probably met there. Tadini advocated monocular cataract surgery even when the contralateral eye had good vision, in France, in 1771, and this led to some disputes with his ophthalmic colleagues who wrote that monocular cataract surgery would lead to diplopia. Tadini's treatment of patients with monocular blindness was satirized in a French-language newspaper in 1788. Casanova wrote in his memoirs, published well after his death in June 1798, that Tadini had told him of the idea of intraocular lenses in Warsaw in the first half of 1766. This is impossible, because Tadini was in Constantinople at the time. In all probability, Casanova heard of the unsuccessful attempt of Johan Virgilius Casaamata (1741–1807) of Dresden to place an intraocular lens, which occurred before January 1797. Casanova then falsely attributed Casaamata's idea of intraocular lenses to Tadini. Casanova could have seen the January 1797 publication describing Casaamata's attempt, or could have heard of Casaamata's attempt through his connections with the court at Dresden. Casaamata was the first to actually attempt the correction of aphakia by implanting a lens.
