= Fyodorov Eye Microsurgery Complex =

Geography
- Location: Moscow, Russia
- Coordinates: 55.870923°N 37.537818°E

History
- Opened: 1988

Links
- Lists: Hospitals in Russia

The S.N. Fyodorov Eye Microsurgery Complex is a clinical and research ophthalmological center in Moscow, founded in 1988 by the Russian eye surgeon Svyatoslav Fyodorov. The center also includes regional branches in Cheboksary, Irkutsk, Kaluga, Khabarovsk, Krasnodar, Novosibirsk, Orenburg, Saint Petersburg, Tambov, Volgograd, and Yekaterinburg.

Led by Fyodorov the center became famous for the refractive surgery procedures performed in a way aimed to be similar to an assembly line, with patients on operating tables rotated from one doctor to another, each of them responsible only for one part of the procedure. The center has received many international awards. In the same years, Fyodorov converted a seagoing vessel, the Peter I, into an eye clinic, part of the institute, which sailed the Mediterranean and the Indian Ocean. Thanks to the international popularity of its founder and director, the Fyodorov Eye Microsurgery Complex obtained the fame of the best ophthalmic center in the world, with eleven branches in regional locations. During the years, it welcomed the best Russians & others medical doctors and surgeons from different countries wanting to specialize in ophthalmology. At present, the center treats cataract, refractive abnormalities, glaucoma, vitreal, retinal and optic nerve pathology, corneal diseases and deals with daily examinations of 2000 patients.
