= Iris-fixated intraocular lens =

Intraocular lens

Iris-fixated intraocular lens is an intraocular lens that is implanted surgically into the eye and attached to the iris. Originally developed for aphakia, phakic versions have also been produced to correct myopia (nearsightedness), hyperopia (farsightedness), and astigmatism. They are suited for correction of eyes where corneal refractive surgery is not applicable.

Early models were sutured to the iris with a stitch; the claw fixation method made iris stitching unnecessary. The iris-claw lens is fixated to the anterior iris surface by enclavation of a fold of iris tissue into the two diametrically opposed claws of the lens. The fixation sites are located in the midperiphery of the iris, which is immobile during pupillary movement.

The original biconvex lens design was modified into a convex-concave design, and manufactured as Artisan/Verisyse lens and later the foldable model (Artiflex), a three-piece lens with silicone optic and PMMA claws, was developed.

== See also ==
- Phakic intraocular lens
- Intraocular lens
