= Angle-supported intraocular lens =

Lens for anterior chamber implantation

Angle-supported intraocular lenses are a special kind of intraocular lens that can be implanted surgically into the anterior chamber of the eye. These lenses are called angle-supported because the footplates of the lens rest in the irido-corneal angle.

Current models of angle-supported phakic IOLs include: Acrysof AC, Phakic 6, Kelman-Duet, I-Care, ZSAL-4, Vivarte and NuVita. Neither have FDA approval yet.

== See also ==
- Phakic intraocular lens
