= Multifocal diffractive lens =

A multifocal diffractive lens is a diffractive optical element (DOE) that allows a single incident beam to be focused simultaneously at several positions along the propagation axis.

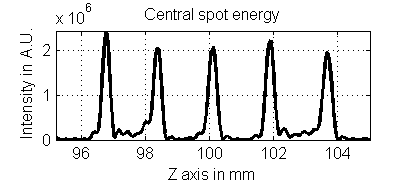
Example of multifocal peak intensity distribution along optical axis.(Courtesy of Holo/Or)

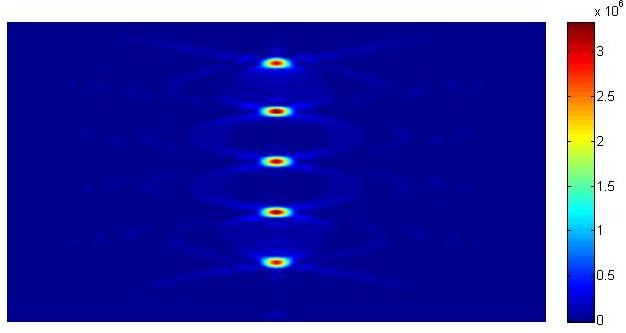
Intensity distribution of multifocal lens 5 foci in Z-X plane

== Principle of operation ==
An incident laser beam is deflected by grooved diffraction pattern into axial diffraction orders along its optical axis. The foci appear around the far field position. With an additional focusing lens, foci from multifocal lens will appear at certain distances from the focal point of the lens.

== Theory ==
The multifocal spots location is a function of refractive focal length f_{Refractive} and predetermined diffractive focal length f_{Diffractive} The focal spot at the "zero" order refers to the refractive focal length of the lens being used.

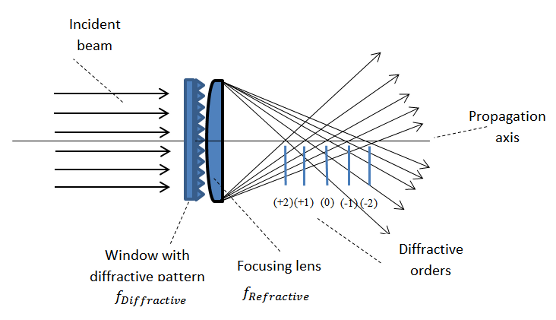

The distance between the focal spots can be described by the equation

$$\frac {1}{f_m} = \frac {1}{f_\mathrm{Refractive}}+\frac{m}{f_\mathrm{Diffractive}},\ \mathrm{for}\ m = \pm 1, \pm 2, \pm 3...$$,
where f_{m} is the focal length for the mth diffractive order,
f_{Refractive} is the focal length of the refractive lens, and
f_{Diffractive} is the focal length of the diffractive lens.

== Applications ==
- Laser cutting
- Laser drilling
- Microscopy
- Ophthalmology: Multifocal contact lenses and multifocal intraocular lenses
