= Clear lens extraction =

Corrective eye surgery

- Other names: Refractive lensectomy or Refractive lens exchange
- Specialty: Ophthalmology

Clear lens extraction, also known as refractive lensectomy, custom lens replacement or refractive lens exchange is a surgical procedure in which clear lens of the human eye is removed. Unlike cataract surgery, where the cloudy lens is removed to treat a cataract, clear lens extraction is done to surgically correct refractive errors such as high myopia. It can also be done in hyperopic or presbyopic patients who wish to have a multifocal IOL implanted to avoid wearing glasses. It is also used as a treatment for diseases such as angle closure glaucoma.

== Overview ==
As opposed to procedures that use lasers to make corrections to the corneal surface, such as LASIK, the clear lens extraction procedure uses the same procedures as cataract surgery.

== Indications ==
Clear lens extraction can be done in patients with severe refractive error and/or presbyopia who wish to avoid spectacles. It is often necessary in patients with severe refractive error who cannot undergo other refractive procedures such as LASIK or photorefractive keratectomy.Clear lens extraction is also used as a treatment of choice in patients with diseases such as angle closure glaucoma. A study also found that CLE is even more effective than laser peripheral iridotomy in patients with angle closure glaucoma. A systematic review comparing lens extraction and laser peripheral iridotomy for treating acute primary angle closure found that lens extraction potentially provides better intraocular pressure control and reduces medication needs over time. However, it remains uncertain if it significantly lowers the risk of recurrent episodes or reduces the need for additional surgeries.

== Procedure ==
Procedure is similar to cataract surgery, most commonly followed by an intraocular lens implantation. In patients requiring only distance vision correction, a conventional mono-focal intraocular lens is placed in both eyes after the clear lens is removed. While distance vision is fine in this, reading glasses are required for near vision. Another method is to correct one eye only for distance vision and the other eye for near vision only. The best way to achieve both distance vision and near vision is to place multifocal IOLs or accommodating IOLs in both eyes.

The intraocular lens power calculations for clear lens extraction is similar to calculations used for conventional cataract surgery. Under topical anesthesia, through a 2.2 mm corneal incision, the lens nucleus and cortex are removed by irrigation and aspiration technique using a phaco machine. After removal of lens material, the viscoelastic solution initially instilled is removed from the anterior chamber, intraocular lens is inserted and the corneal wound is closed by stromal hydration method. In some people with very high myopia, the eye may be left aphakic, without intraocular lens implantation.

== Complications ==
In addition to the common complications of cataract surgery, clear lens extraction may also cause premature posterior vitreous detachment and retinal detachment, particularly in patients with high Myopia. However, modern surgical techniques and advanced lens technology have significantly reduced the likelihood of this and other complications. The procedure is generally safe and effective when performed by experienced surgeons, with most patients experiencing improved vision post-surgery without major complications.

== History ==
As opposed to the more commonly performed cataract treatment, the idea of removing the lens exclusively for refractive purposes first emerged in the 18th century. French ophthalmologist Abbé Desmonceaux may be the first to suggest such an operation in 1776 for a patient with high myopia. He recommended the operation to Baron Michael Johann de Wenzel, although it is not known whether he ever performed the operation.

The first systematic work on clear lens extraction was carried out by Polish ophthalmologist Vincenz Fukala in Vienna. Fucala advised clear lens extraction in young high myopic (−13 diopters or more) patients with poor vision and inability to work.
