= Phakic intraocular lens =

Lens implanted in eye in addition to the natural lens

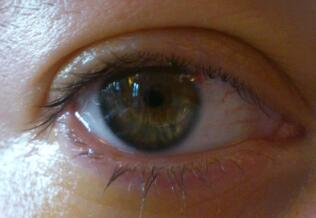
- Photo of an eye after PIOL-implantation, 24 hours after surgery. The lens is visible in front of the iris; the pupil is still small due to presurgery eyedrops.

A phakic intraocular lens (PIOL) is an intraocular lens that is implanted surgically into the eye to correct refractive errors without removing the natural lens (also known as "phakos", hence the term). Intraocular lenses that are implanted into eyes after the eye's natural lens has been removed during cataract surgery are known as pseudophakic.

Phakic intraocular lenses are indicated for patients with high refractive errors when the usual laser options for surgical correction (LASIK and PRK) are contraindicated. Phakic IOLs are designed to correct high myopia ranging from −5 to −20 D if the patient has enough anterior chamber depth (ACD) of at least 3 mm.

Three types of phakic IOLs are available:

- Angle-supported
- Iris-fixated
- Sulcus-supported intraocular lens

== Medical uses ==
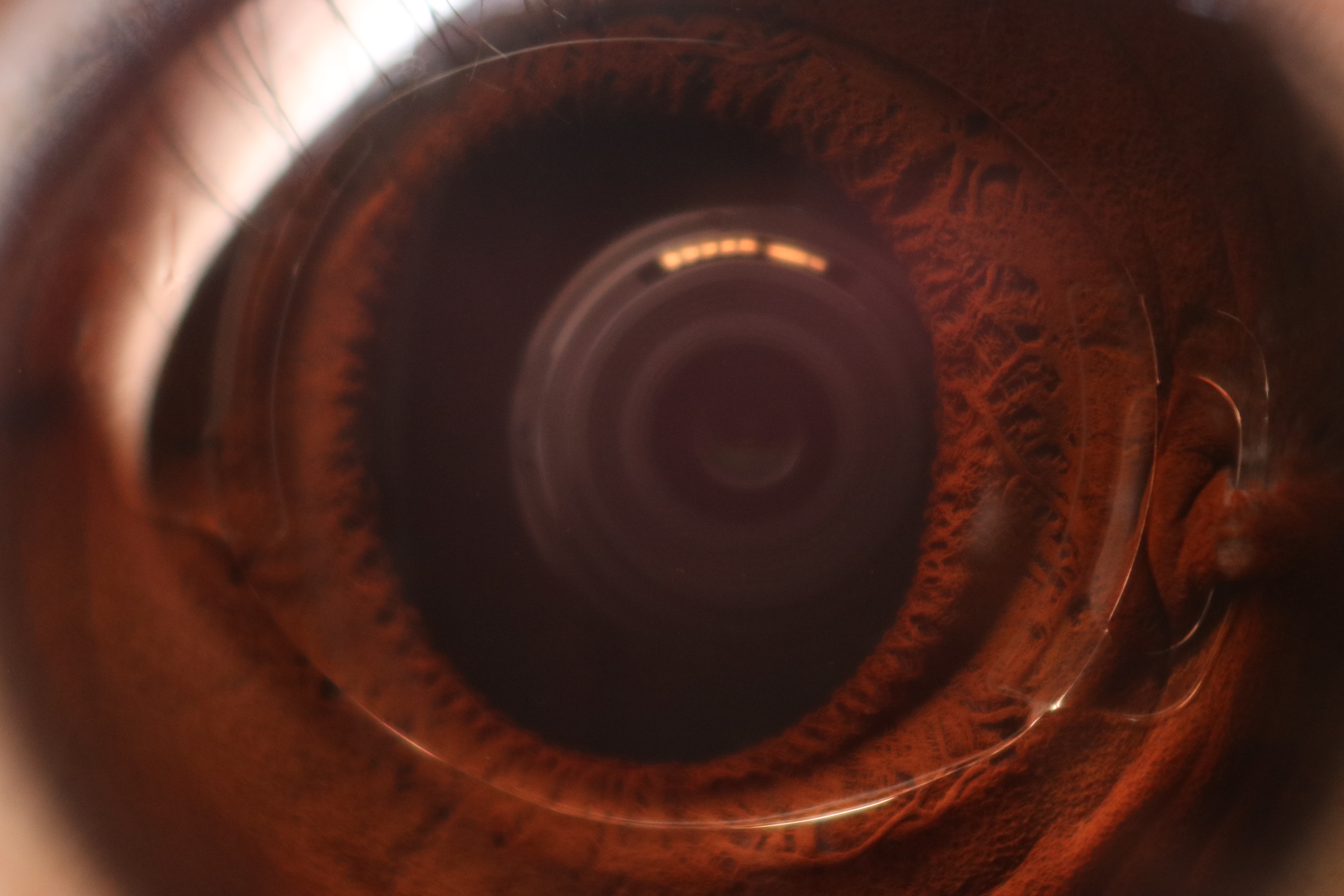
An installed PIOL, with flash photography

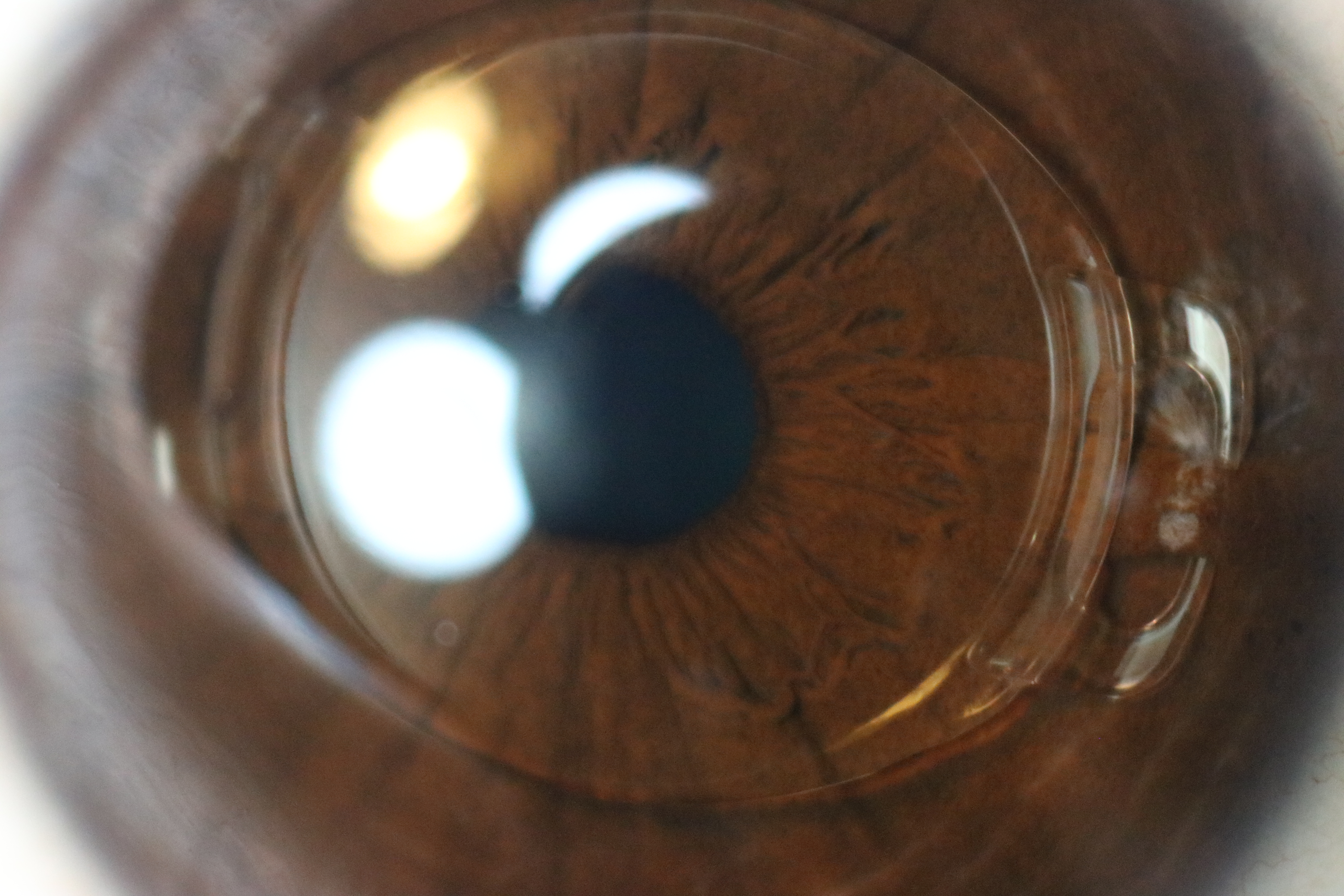
An installed PIOL, without flash photography

LASIK can correct myopia up to -12 to -14 D. The higher the intended correction the thinner and flatter the cornea will be post-operatively. For LASIK surgery, one has to preserve a safe residual stromal bed of at least 250 μm, preferably 300 μm. Beyond these limits there is an increased risk of developing corneal ectasia (i.e. corneal forward bulging) due to thin residual stromal bed which results in loss of visual quality. Due to the risk of higher order aberrations there is a current trend toward reducing the upper limits of LASIK and PRK to around -8 to -10 D. Phakic intraocular lenses are safer than excimer laser surgery for those with significant myopia.

Phakic intraocular lenses are contraindicated in patients who do not have a stable refraction for at least 6 months or are 21 years of age or younger. Preexisting eye disorders such as uveitis are another contraindication.

Although PIOLs for hyperopia are being investigated, there is less enthusiasm for these lenses because the anterior chamber tends to be shallower than in myopic patients. A hyperopic model ICL (posterior chamber PIOL) is available.

A corneal endothelium cell count of less than 2000 to 2500 cells per mm^{2} is a relative contraindication for PIOL implantation.

=== Advantages ===
PIOLs have the advantage of treating a much larger range of myopic and hyperopic refractive errors than can be safely and effectively treated with corneal refractive surgery. The skills required for insertion are, with a few exceptions, similar to those used in cataract surgery. The equipment is significantly less expensive than an excimer laser and is similar to that used for cataract surgery. In addition, the PIOL is removable; therefore, the refractive effect should theoretically be reversible. However, any intervening damage caused by the PIOL would most likely be permanent. When compared with clear lens extraction, or refractive lens exchange the PIOL has the advantage of preserving natural accommodation and may have a lower risk of postoperative retinal detachment because of the preservation of the crystalline lens and minimal vitreous destabilization.

=== Disadvantages ===
PIOL insertion is an intraocular procedure. With all surgeries there are associated risks. In addition, each PIOL style has its own set of associated risks. In the case of PIOLs made of polymethylmethacrylate (PMMA), surgical insertion requires a larger incision, which may result in postoperative astigmatism. By comparison, PIOLS made of a foldable gel-like substance require a very small incision due to the flexibility of the material and thus significantly reduces astigmatism risk. In the cases where refractive outcomes are not optimal, LASIK can be used for fine-tuning. If a patient eventually develops a visually significant cataract, the PIOL will have to be explanted at the time of cataract surgery, possibly through a larger-than-usual incision.

Another concern is progressive shallowing of the anterior chamber which normally occurs with advancing age due to the growth of the eye's natural lens. Multiple studies have shown a 12–17 μm/year decrease in the anterior chamber depth with aging. If a phakic IOL patient is assumed to have a 50-year lifespan, the overall decline in ACD may add up to 0.6–0.85 millimetres (0.024–0.033 in); long-term data about this effect are not available. This concern is more important in implantable collamer lens because it is implanted in the narrowest part of the anterior segment.

=== Contraindications ===
Lower levels of acceptable risk may be appropriate for implantation of phakic lenses than for cataract surgery, as the risk-benefit trade-off is less for improving vision than for restoring vision.

== Complications ==
- Glare and halos which may cause night time symptoms, especially in patients with larger pupil diameters.
- Cataract is the most crucial concern for the Sulcus-Supported PIOLs. According to the FDA, approximately 6% to 7% of eyes develop anterior subcapsular opacities at 7+ years following implantable collamer lens implantation and 1% to 2% progress to clinically significant cataract during the same period, especially very high myopes and older patients.
- Endothelial cell loss especially for the anterior chamber PIOLs. A study observed a continual steady loss of endothelial cells of -1.8% per year.
- Pigment dispersion may be seen in iris-fixated and sulcus-supported PIOLs due to iris abrasion during pupillary movement.
- Other complications include glaucoma and PIOL dislocation or decentration.

== Preoperative evaluation ==
Anterior chamber depth (ACD, i.e. the distance between the crystalline lens and cornea including the corneal thickness) is required before the surgery and measured with the use of ultrasound.

Iris-fixated IOLs are fixated to iris therefore they have the advantage of being one size (8.5 mm).

Sulcus-supported IOLs need to be implanted in the ciliary sulcus which may have various diameters among individuals, therefore anterior chamber diameter needs to be measured with a calliper or with the use of eye imaging instruments such as Orbscan and high frequency ultrasound. A calliper and Orbscan measure the external limbus-to-limbus diameter of anterior chamber (white-to-white diameter) which provides an approximate estimation of AC diameter but UBM and OCT offer a more adequate measurement of the sulcus diameter (sulcus-to-sulcus diameter) and should be used when available.

== Power calculation ==
The power of phakic lens is independent of the axial length of the eye. Rather it depends on central corneal power, anterior chamber depth (ACD) and patient refraction (preoperative spherical equivalent). The most common formula for calculating the power of phakic IOL is the following:

$P= {1000 n \over{1000 n \over K+R}-d}-{1000 n \over{1000 n \over K}-d}$

P : Power of phakic IOL
n : Refractive index of aqueous (1.336)
K : Central corneal power in diopters
R : Patient refraction at the corneal vertex
d : Effective lens position in mm

The effective lens position is calculated as the difference between the anterior chamber depth and the distance between the PIOL and the crystalline lens. From ultrasonographic examinations of PIOLs, the lens-optic distance shows less variability compared with the cornea-optic distance. Therefore, it is preferable to use measured ACD and subtract it with an 'optic-lens' constant to obtain the value of ELP. For the Artisan/Verisyse lens the optic-lens constant is 0.84 mm. The ICL power is calculated using the Olsen-Feingold formula by using a four variable formula modified by a regression analysis of past results.

== Surgical technique ==
The Artisan (Verisyse) lens is implanted under pharmacological miosis. After creating proper incision the lens is grasped with curved holding forceps and inserted. Once in the anterior chamber and while firmly holding the lens with forceps, temporal and nasal iris tissue is enclavated with a special needle. The operation is completed with an iridectomy and the incision is sutured.

The EVO ICL (STAAR® Surgical's phakic IOL) is implanted under pharmacological mydriasis and implanted in the retropupillary position, between the eye's iris and the crystalline lens, using cartridge-injector or forceps. Both eyes can usually be done on the same day.

Steroid antibiotic eye drops are usually prescribed for 2–4 weeks after surgery. Regular follow-ups are recommended.

== Risk ==
Though ICL surgery has shown to be effective, it sometimes can result in complications such as:

- If the ICL is oversized or poorly placed, it can increase eye pressure. Glaucoma may grow as a result of this.
- If you have high eye pressure for an extended period, you may lose your vision.
- An ICL can reduce fluid circulation in your eye, putting you at risk for cataracts. This can also happen if the ICL does not fit well or causes chronic inflammation.
- Cataracts and glaucoma both cause blurry vision. If the lens isn't the right size, you may experience other visual issues such as glare or double vision.
- Endothelial cells in the cornea are reduced as a result of eye surgery and aging. If the cells die too quickly, a cloudy cornea and vision loss may result.
- Your retina may detach from its normal position as a result of eye surgery. It is a rare complication that necessitates immediate medical attention.
- This is another unusual side effect. It has the potential to cause permanent vision loss.
- You may require additional surgery to remove the lens and correct any issues that have arisen.
