= Bioptics (surgery) =

Vision-correction surgical technique

Bioptics is a combinatorial vision-correction refractive surgical technique performed by ophthalmologists, in which refractive error of the eye is treated on both the lenticular and corneal optical planes. The dual technique was pioneered, and the term coined, by Roberto Zaldívar in 1989. The procedure is increasing in popularity (as of 2006).

As of 2014, Most refractive surgeons still use Bioptics in a variety of combinations.
