= International Intra-Ocular Implant Club =

The Intra-Ocular Implant Club was founded in 1966 by the English ophthalmic surgeons Sir Harold Ridley and Peter Choyce, to promote research in the field of intraocular lens (IOL) implantation. At that time there was widespread opposition in the ophthalmic surgery profession to the use of IOLs. The founders saw the club as a forum to allow free and unhindered exchange of ideas about IOLs and implantation surgical techniques. From the outset it was international in its membership and it set itself a parental and advisory role for the then nascent national societies to develop in each country for intraocular implant surgeons. However, this global role was only acknowledged in the name change in July 1975, when the Intra-Ocular Implant Club became The International Intra-Ocular Implant Club (IIIC).

In November 2011, The International Intra-Ocular Implant Club (IIIC) became incorporated as a Private Limited Company under English law.

== History and present-day activity ==
The Intra-Ocular Implant Club (IIIC) was established on 14 July 1966 at the Royal Society of Medicine in London. The sixteen founder members were: Mr. John Pike (Rayners), Dr. Murto (USA), Michael J. Roper-Hall (UK), Svyatoslav Fyodorov (USSR), Neil Dallas (UK), Dr. Brown (UK), Dr. Rubinstein (UK), Warren Reese (USA), Dr. Lurie (UK), Jorn Boberg-Ans and Sonja Boberg-Ans (Denmark), Cees Binkhorst (The Netherlands), Peter Choyce (UK), Harold Ridley (UK), Benedetto Strampelli, (Italy) and Edward Epstein (South Africa).

An account of the Club's early history was made by Michael J. Roper-Hall in his 2007 IIIC Medal Lecture at the Club annual dinner meeting in Stockholm that year.

The Club has two annual meetings. The Spring meeting coincides with the annual meeting of the ASCRS (the American Society of Cataract and Refractive Surgeons). The second is in the autumn at the time of the ESCRS (the European Society of Cataract and Refractive Surgeons).annual congress meeting. The meeting format is a working-lunch or dinner wherein Club business is discussed then followed by a Medal lecture. There are two awards of medals made each year: the IIIC Medal lecture and the Jan Worst Medal lecture, named after the Dutch surgeon and pioneer in phakic lens surgery Dr Jan Worst of Groningen.

== See also ==
- David J Apple
