= David J. Apple =

American ophthalmologist (1941-2011)

- Born: David Joseph Apple; September 14, 1941; Alton, Illinois, U.S.
- Died: August 18, 2011 (aged 69); Charleston, South Carolina, U.S.
- Education: Northwestern University; University of Illinois College of Medicine; Louisiana State University (Internship/Residency); University of Iowa (Ophthalmology Residency)
- Awards: American Academy of Ophthalmology (AAO) Life Achievement Honor Award
- Scientific career
- Fields: Ophthalmology, Ophthalmic pathology
- Workplaces: Medical University of South Carolina (Storm Eye Institute); University of Utah

David J. Apple (September 14, 1941 – August 18, 2011) was an ophthalmic pathologist who conducted research on the pathology of intraocular lens complications as well as ophthalmic surgery in general. He was a medical historian and biographer of Sir Harold Ridley, the inventor of the intraocular lens (IOL).

He often stated that Harold Ridley changed the world. What we can say about David Apple is that he vastly improved the world that Harold Ridley changed

Apple founded the Center for Developing World Ophthalmology while he was Professor of Ophthalmology and Pathology at the Storm Eye Institute, Charleston SC. His laboratory is an official Collaborating Center of the Prevention of Blindness Programme of the World Health Organization (WHO) and his research and meetings with WHO officials was instrumental in providing information to WHO on which type of IOL should be used in cataract surgery in developing countries.

== Background ==
David Joseph Apple was born in Alton, Illinois on September 14, 1941 to Joseph and Margaret Bearden Apple. He had one brother, Robert born in 1937 who predeceased him in 1994.

== Education and career ==
David Apple attended East Alton-Wood River High School located in Wood River, IL and graduated in 1959. He was a graduate of Northwestern University, University of Illinois College of Medicine and served his internship and residency in Pathology at Louisiana State University. In 1980 he completed his residency in ophthalmology at the University of Iowa. He was Assistant and subsequently Associate Professor of Ophthalmology under Morton F. Goldberg, MD at The University of Illinois Eye and Ear Infirmary and Abraham Lincoln School of Medicine in Chicago from 1971 to 1975. He then completed his residency in Clinical Ophthalmology under Frederick C. Blodi, MD at the University of Iowa in 1979.

Apple moved to South Carolina in 1988 to become Professor of Ophthalmology and Pathology, Professor and Chairman at the Storm Eye Institute, Medical University of South Carolina, Charleston. He held the Pawek-Vallotton Chair of Biomedical Engineering and was Director of the Center or Research on Ocular Therapeutics and Biodevices until 2002. During his Chairmanship of the Department of Ophthalmology in Charleston from 1988 to 1996 he successfully led the effort to raise $8.8 million to complete a three-floor expansion and general renovation of the Eye Institute. When he returned, he resigned from the Chair and became Director of Research for the Department.

His laboratory in Charleston (and at later sites: Salt Lake City, Sullivan's Island and Heidelberg) was an official Collaborating Center of the WHO Prevention of Blindness Programme. His meeting with WHO Programme director Dr. Bjorn Thylefors of the Prevent Blindness Division, was instrumental in providing information to WHO on which type of IOL should be used in cataract surgery in developing countries and Apple wrote on the subject in 1991.

He returned to Utah in 2002 and transferred his Center for Intraocular Lens Research back to Salt Lake City, Utah: the city where he had begun his IOL-research.

His career was distinguished by being the only ophthalmologist to have received the four most respected honours in his field:

1) The Life Achievement Honor Award by the American Academy of Ophthalmology (AAO)

2) The AAO Ophthalmology Hall of Fame award in 2007

3) The ASCRS Innovator's (Kelman) Award in 2005

4) The Binkhorst Lecture Medal in 1988.

In 1998 he became the only American to have been selected to give the European Guest Lecture at the Oxford Ophthalmological Congress, held annually at the University of Oxford. He received the Senior Honor Award from the American Academy of Ophthalmology (AAO) in San Diego, CA.

He was elected in 2003 to the German Academy of Research in the Natural Sciences Deutsche Akademie der Naturforscher 'Leopoldina. In co-authorship with Prof. Dr. Gottfried O.H. Naumann he published in 1990 Pathologie des Auges, a German-language ocular pathology textbook. He published the English version as Pathology of the Eye, in 1986.

In 2006 Apple received an award from the International Intra-Ocular Implant Club - the IIIC Medal. His subject was "Sir Harold Ridley and his Fight for Sight" in the centenary year of Ridley's birth.

At the 2012 meeting of the ESCRS in Milan, the Commemorative Lecture David J. Apple The Father of IOL Pathology, was given by Steve Arshinoff MD of Canada:

David was the first IOL pathologist. He was an "IOL doctor’s doctor", as pathologists often are. He taught us to respect our heritage – those whose struggles to innovate enriched our abilities to care for our patients, but to remember: Most innovations fail. He also taught us to be cautious with the latest innovation, and to study the long-term effects of each new IOL or gadget, before fully accepting it.

== Sir Harold Ridley ==
In Salt Lake City during the 1980s, Apple started to study intraocular lenses (IOLs), including those explanted lenses which had been removed (explanted) from the eye, following complications. His scientific papers on IOLs attracted the interest of Harold Ridley, the British inventor of the intraocular lens. Through mutual contacts Ridley asked David Apple to visit him at his home near Salisbury in England. Thus began a friendship which did much to legitimise and restore Ridley's reputation as the inventor of the IOL and Apple's reputation as the foremost researcher in IOL research.

== Personal life ==
Dr. Apple married Ann Addlestone In 1995 and became stepfather to Scott E. Kabat and Jacqueline B. Kabat. Through his brother, Robert V. Apple's family, he had one nephew: Lee B. Apple and two nieces: Rana Apple Ford and Dione Apple Badkar, all from California.

In the late 1990s he developed a serious illness (self-diagnosed – correctly – as a metastatic cancer at the base of the tongue.) Between 1999 and 2011 he had numerous bouts of pneumonia and was frequently hospitalised – most seriously with a cerebral vascular stroke two years after his move to Salt Lake City.

Besides ophthalmology, Dr. Apple took an interest in classical music – he served on the Board of the Charleston Symphony, the Board of the Charleston Ballet Theatre and was active in Chamber Music Charleston. He was an amateur military historian, specialising in World War II and the US Civil War. In a tribute I. Howard Fine MD wrote affectionately of his friend,

On a personal level, David was a good friend and a delightful person with a subtle sense of humor. He had a passion for history, especially the history of science, the Civil War, and music. He liked to inform ophthalmologists that Johann Sebastian Bach died shortly after his health began to deteriorate as a result of a botched cataract surgery by an itinerant surgeon. David reminded us that the first hostilities of the Civil War took place in Charleston, his home, with the Confederate bombardment of Fort Sumter. He had an enormous corpus of knowledge and was a great lover of music. While living in Charleston, he served on the boards of the Charleston Symphony and the Charleston Ballet and was active in Chamber Music Charleston. He was pleased that his home was the model for one of the houses on Catfish Row, the stage setting for the American opera "Porgy and Bess." He loved to travel, was fluent in German, and had a special affection for his dachshunds. His wife, Ann, was the love of his life and a favorite of their friends throughout the world. A few years after their marriage, David was diagnosed with a malignancy, which required surgery, chemotherapy, and radiation therapy. Ann nurtured, maintained, and cared for him magnificently over the ensuing years as he dealt with the chronic pain and the terrible side effects of his surgery and anti-cancer treatments.

David Apple died on the afternoon of August 18, 2011 in Charleston SC, The funeral service was on Sunday, August 21, 2011 at the Beth Elohim Temple with interment at Beth Elohim Cemetery, Huguenin Avenue. Charleston SC.

== Apple's legacy ==
Miyake-Apple technique. This method of sectioning the cadaver eye was initially developed by Kansatu Miyake MD and refined by David Apple. The eye is disected posterior to the posterior lens capsule and the anterior segment is mounted above a camera which allows observation of the IOL in-situ in the capsule from a posteior view: thus as though looking out on the world through the lens and cornea. Using this technique, Apple and his colleagues were able to analyse the performance of IOLs made of different biomaterials and different lens designs.

The Apple Korps. In what may prove a most enduring legacy Dr Apple trained over 200 students and doctors at his Charleston and Salt Lake City sites and these "students" are now in key positions in ophthalmic education and practice throughout the world.

Research Laboratory. At the time of his death, Apple's laboratory was in Sullivan's Island near Charleston, South Carolina. In 2012 the David J Apple International Laboratory for Ocular Pathology was re-located and re-established at Heidelberg University, in the University Eye Department. Professor Gerd U. Auffarth, Eye Department Chairman – a former research fellow in the Apple Korps – outlined his plans to create an international laboratory for research on intraocular ophthalmic devices, thus continuing and extending the research work initiated by David Apple. The laboratory in Heidelberg holds Professor Apple’s archives, historical laboratory samples and correspondence.

Amon-Apple Enhanced Square Edge. This is a barrier to cell proliferation at the haptic-optic junction of single-piece IOLs. The Edge was first developed by Peter Toop and Mike Ring – both engineers at the IOL manufacturer Rayner Intraocular Lenses Limited in 2003, after taking advice from Prof. Michael Amon, Ophthalmic Surgeon in Vienna, Austria and advice from David Apple. The design feature is intended to reduce Posterior Capsular Opacification (PCO) by creating an insurmountable physical barrier to cell migration from the haptic surface onto the optic surface of the lens. Both Amon and Apple recognised in 2002 (through respectively a laboratory study on Centerflex minus power lenses and a clinical study of the regular power Centerflex lenses ) that all modern single-piece, injectable IOLs in 2002 had a weakness (which Apple termed the "Achilles heel") at the haptic-optic junction: where there is no square edge and thus an incomplete barrier to PCO.

== Writing ==
His publications concerning the IOL studies and his review of the history of IOLs led to the publication of two textbooks: Evolution of Intraocular Lenses in 1985 and Intraocular Lenses. Evolution, Designs, Complications, and Pathology in 1989.

Dr. Apple's 2006 biography, Sir Harold Ridley and his Fight for Sight: He changed the world so that we may better see it came about when Harold Ridley, the British inventor of the intraocular lens, asked David Apple to be his biographer.

Dr. Apple presented more than 1,400 scientific lectures, 168 scientific posters, and more than 60 exhibits and videos. He authored 566 scientific publications, including 23 textbooks, 71 chapters in textbooks.

== See also ==
- Harold Ridley (ophthalmologist)
- Intraocular lens
