= Harold Ridley (ophthalmologist) =

English ophthalmologist (1906–2001)

- Born: Nicholas Harold Lloyd Ridley; 10 July 1906; Kibworth, England
- Died: 25 May 2001 (aged 94); Salisbury, England
- Resting place: Swinstead, England
- Citizenship: British
- Education: Pembroke College, Cambridge; St Thomas' Hospital
- Known for: Intraocular lens
- Spouse(s): Elisabeth Jane Wetherill, August 16, 1916 to 19 March 2010.
- Children: Margaret Ridley; Nicholas Charles Wetherill Ridley; David Ridley
- Awards: Fellow of the Royal Society; Knight Bachelor
- Scientific career
- Workplaces: University of Cambridge; St Thomas' Hospital; Moorfields Eye Hospital NHS Foundation Trust

Sir Nicholas Harold Lloyd Ridley (10 July 1906 – 25 May 2001) was an English ophthalmologist who invented the intraocular lens and pioneered intraocular lens surgery for cataract patients.

== Early years ==
Nicholas Harold Lloyd Ridley was born in Kibworth Harcourt, Leicestershire, the elder son of Nicholas Charles Ridley and his wife, Margaret (née Parker). He had a younger brother. Known from childhood by his middle name (Harold), Ridley had a stammer which he was largely able to manage. As a child he met and sat on the lap of Florence Nightingale, a close friend of his mother.

He was educated at Charterhouse School before studying at Pembroke College, Cambridge from 1924 to 1927, and completed his medical training in 1930 at St Thomas' Hospital. Subsequently, he worked as a surgeon at both St Thomas' and Moorfields Eye Hospital in London, specialising in ophthalmology. In 1938, Ridley was appointed full surgeon and consultant at Moorfields Hospital and later appointed consultant surgeon in 1946.

== Cataract operations and intraocular lenses ==
During World War II, Ridley saw Royal Air Force casualties with eye injuries, including Squadron Leader Gordon "Mouse" Cleaver of 601 Squadron. Ridley observed that when splinters of acrylic plastic from aircraft cockpit canopies became lodged in their eyes, this did not trigger inflammatory rejection as did glass splinters. This led him to propose the use of artificial lenses to treat cataract.

The lack of an inflammatory reaction was known to other Royal Air Force ophthalmologists, such as Arthur Llewelyn McCurry and Philip Livingston, who published on the subject in September 1948. Others had used acrylic for ophthalmic prostheses. At the Oxford Ophthalmological Congress in July 1947, H. B. Stallard discussed acrylic prostheses to prevent the contraction of the orbital socket; and acrylic corneal grafts were presented by Franceschetti in London in March 1949. Ridley used a variety of acrylic called Transpex I, which had been employed since 1944 to create optical devices, such as retro-reflector prisms, spectacles, and contact lenses (1946). Ridley began working on intraocular lenses in the autumn of 1949, when a medical student asked him whether he would place a lens after performing a cataract surgery.

On 29 November 1949, at St Thomas' Hospital, Ridley achieved the first implant of an intraocular lens, although it was not until 8 February 1950 that he left an artificial lens permanently in place in an eye. Ridley's first intraocular lens had the same radius of curvature as the human crystalline lens, even though the index of refraction of Transpex was known to be higher than that of the crystalline lens, and, as a result, the first patient had a postoperative spherical equivalent of -21 D, which focussed her at about 4.8 cm distance. Ridley sterilized the first intraocular lenses in cetrimide, an antiseptic invented by I.C.I., the manufacturer of Transpex. Cetrimide could produce a postoperative uveitis because it could not always be fully rinsed off.

The first lens was manufactured by Rayner. The first IOL implant in the United States was performed in 1952: a Rayner-Ridley lens implanted at the Wills Eye Hospital in Philadelphia. The intraocular lens was approved as "safe and effective" and approved for use in the USA by the Food and Drug Administration in 1981. The first FDA-approved lenses – Choyce Mark VIII and Choyce Mark IX Anterior Chamber – were manufactured by Rayner.

In 1987, Gordon "Mouse" Cleaver, whose injury in 1940 helped Ridley conceive the idea of using an acrylic intraocular lens, underwent cataract surgery and the implantation of such a lens to restore his sight.

== Wartime service and ophthalmic research ==
Ridley was in civilian hospital services in South East England during the early years of World War II, when he saw injured pilots from the Battle of Britain. In the middle - to end-years of the war he was with the R.A.M.C (Royal Army Medical Corps) and was posted to West Africa and South East Asia.

=== Onchocerciasis (River Blindness) ===
While in Africa, Ridley led important research into onchocerciasis when he was stationed in the Gold Coast, now Ghana, for part of his war service. He acted as part-time sanitation officer at the capital city of Accra, and met Brigadier G. M. Findlay, AMS, who stimulated Ridley's interest to study River Blindness, an endemic disease in parts of the country. To find onchocerciasis patients, in February 1944, Ridley left the coastal city and travelled overland with Findlay and Captain John Holden to north west Ghana. He worked in Funsi in the Wa East District of the Upper West Region for two weeks, examining patients with a slit-lamp which ran off two 6-volt car batteries. Most (90%) had onchocerciasis; ten percent of them were blind. Conditions were primitive and Ridley recorded his observations of the retinal fundus by water-colour painting and photography. His painting of the fundus (sometimes termed the "Ridley fundus" of onchocerciasis) was completed in Accra upon his return from Funsi. "The attention he called to this disease constitutes one of Ridley's major contributions to ophthalmology. His monograph 'Ocular Onchocerciasis', published in 1945 in a supplement of the British Journal of Ophthalmology, was a landmark."

=== Snake venom ophthalmia ===
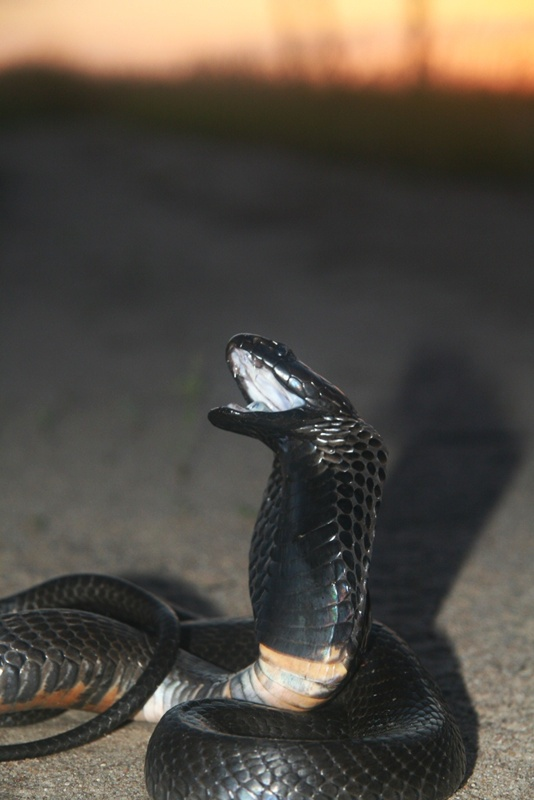
Black-necked cobra

Writing as Major Harold Ridley, he published in 1944 a short paper in the British Journal of Ophthalmology on spitting snakes and an account on the composition and action of snake venom in general. From his own experiences in the Gold Coast, Ridley described snake venom ophthalmia in a 30-year-old labourer named Gogi Kumasi who was cutting grass when a Black-necked cobra raised its head from the grass and forcibly spat venom toward the man's right eye from a distance of four or five feet. Ridley treated the man and followed his case until the eye had fully recovered, after about a week. After discussion on the therapeutic uses of snake venom, he conjectured that in the future diluted venom or a constituent of venom might be used as a powerful anaesthetic in some cases of ophthalmic surgery.

=== Nutritional amblyopia ===
After completing 18 months in Ghana, in 1944 Ridley was transferred to India and then Burma, where he studied and treated malnourished former prisoners of war. His biographer David Apple reports Ridley's own words: "In Calcutta, we basically had nothing to do with no assignments – a situation which continued after transfer to Parragan, near Calcutta. Finally, I was transferred to Rangoon, Burma, where life began again. I treated over 200 released allied prisoners of war in Rangoon and Singapore who suffered from nutritional amblyopia while Japanese prisoners of war. Many of the prisoners had worked on the Burma Railway. Starved and ill treated, they had developed sudden central scotoma, relieved by good diet if available. Some developed optic atrophy, some of whom made a partial recovery within six weeks of release. However, the advanced cases, though given a vitamin-rich diet were irreversible. I subsequently wrote an article on the topic of nutritional amblyopia." His paper was published in 1945. "It is uncertain whether disturbance in a visual pathway originates in the retina or optic nerve. Failure of the cortical capillaris to nourish the outer retinal layers at the macula may be significant."

The therapy he used anticipated the use today of multivitamins in ARMD patients. Ridley used multivitamin therapy, returned them to a normal diet, and then noted improvement in the prisoners' condition. The Burma theatre of war permitted the first large population study of individuals with nutritional amblyopia: a total of over 500 within his region of whom about 200 he personally examined and treated.

== The International Intra-Ocular Implant Club ==
The Club was founded in 1966 by Ridley and Peter Choyce, to promote research in the field of IOL implantation. At that time there was widespread opposition in the profession to the use of IOLs. The founders saw the club as a forum to allow free and unhindered exchange of ideas about IOLs and implantation surgical techniques. From the outset it was international in its membership, and set itself a parental and advisory role for the then-nascent national societies to develop in each country for intraocular implant surgeons. However, this global role was only acknowledged in a name change in July 1975, when the Intra-Ocular Implant Club became The International Intra-Ocular Implant Club.

== The Ridley Eye Foundation ==
In 1967, Ridley set up the Ridley Foundation, known as the Ridley Eye Foundation, to raise funds for cataract surgery in developing countries and to treat avoidable blindness. A registered charity under English law, the organisation continues to be active in these fields today, notably in the Middle East. Ridley's son Nicholas serves as its chairman.

== Later life ==
Ridley retired from NHS hospital service in 1971. In the 1990s, he underwent successful bilateral intraocular lens implantation at St Thomas's Hospital by Dr Michael Falcon. Thus, Ridley benefitted from his own invention and the operational procedure he had pioneered but what was most pleasing to him was that he had it done in the hospital where he performed the first operation.

Ridley lived in Stapleford near Salisbury, Wiltshire until his death on 25 May 2001, aged 94. His funeral service and burial were at St Mary's Church, Swinstead, Lincolnshire.

== Recognition, honours and awards ==
In 1986, Ridley was elected a Fellow of the Royal Society. His first academic honour was an honorary doctorate degree, Doctor of Humane Letters (DHL), conferred in 1989 by the Medical University of South Carolina, Charleston.

In 1992, Ridley received the Gullstrand Medal (conferred by the Swedish Society of Medicine) named after Swedish ophthalmic surgeon Allvar Gullstrand. In 1994, he received the Gonin Medal (conferred by the Club Jules Gonin, Lausanne Switzerland) named after the renowned Swiss retinal surgeon Jules Gonin.

In April 1999, at the annual meeting of the American Society of Cataract and Refractive Surgery in Seattle, Washington, Ridley was honoured in a special anniversary session as one of the most outstanding and influential ophthalmologists of the 20th century. Later the same year, at the 1999 meeting of the European Society of Ophthalmology (Stockholm, July 1999) he was honoured; and again at the annual meeting of the European Society of Cataract and Refractive Surgery (Vienna, September 1999).

Announced on 31 December 1999, the New Year Honours 2000 list for the United Kingdom and New Zealand included Ridley as one of forty-five people accorded with the honour of Knight Bachelor, "for pioneering services to Cataract Surgery". Subsequently, at a ceremony in February 2000, aged 93, he was knighted by the Queen at Buckingham Palace. This Millennium Honour was the culmination of years of lobbying work by Ridley's biographer (David J Apple) and prominent surgeon friends such as Emanuel Rosen and Thomas Neuhann, together with leaders of the ophthalmic medical device industry such as Donald J Munro, chairman and managing director of the Rayner company of Brighton & Hove, UK.

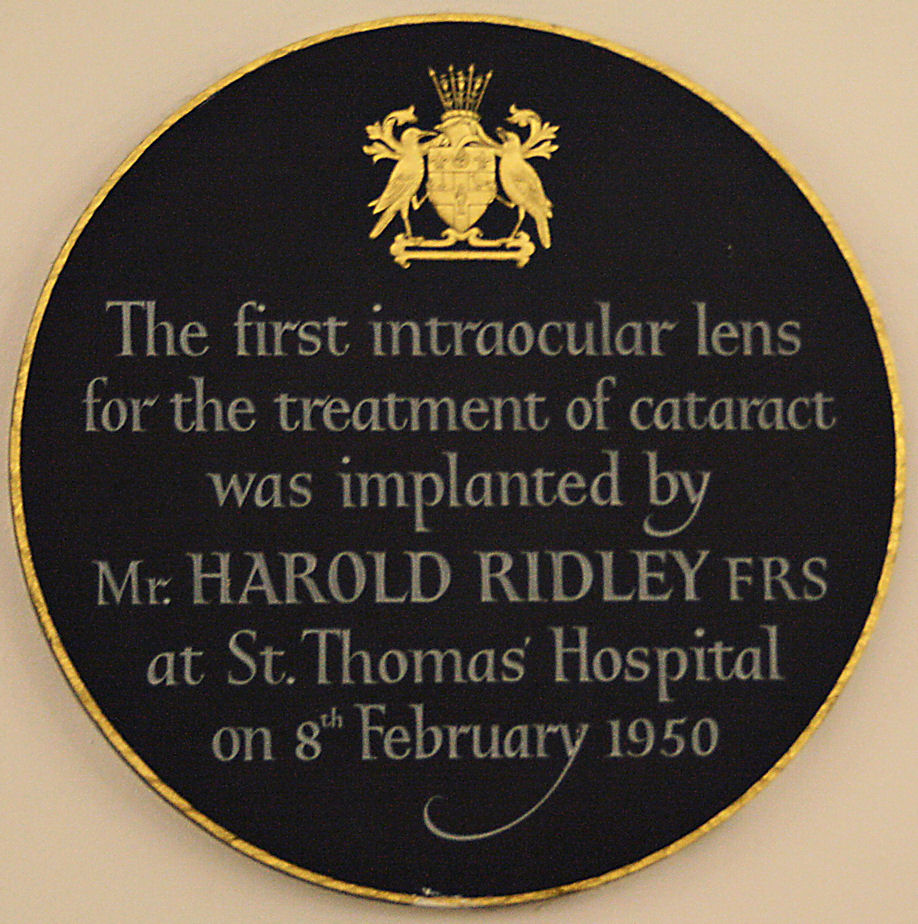
First permanent insertion of intraocular lens, 8 February 1950

In 2001, a plaque was installed at St Thomas's Hospital, London to commemorate the first IOL implantation. Ridley died the same year, in Salisbury, Wiltshire.

In September 2010, the Royal Mail issued a series of commemorative postage stamps to mark "Medical Breakthroughs". Designed by Howard Brown, the 67p stamp depicted artificial lens implant surgery pioneered by Sir Harold Ridley 1949.

A Heritage blue plaque to commemorate his groundbreaking work was installed in Kibworth Harcourt, Leicestershire on 18 February 2012, thanks to the research carried out by Bob Haggerty, a local resident who has himself had an intraocular lens fitted, and supported by Kibworth Improvement Team (KiT), the local community partnership.

A plaque in memory of Ridley is installed in the gardens of his alma mater Pembroke College, Cambridge, which plaque reads: "RIDLEY’S WALK / This plaque is placed in memory of Sir Harold Ridley FRS 1906-2001 / pioneer of intraocular lens surgery, graduate & benefactor of this College / after whose ancestor Bishop Nicholas Ridley, Master 1540-1553, / martyred 1555, this path is traditionally named".

In 2013, a biographical profile of Ridley was included in a book called Saving Sight: An eye surgeon's look at life behind the mask and the heroes who changed the way we see, by Andrew Lam.

== Film and TV ==
On 6 January 2016, during the BBC 1 television programme The One Show a short film was shown about the link between Gordon Cleaver and Harold Ridley. Using archive film and photographic material and an interview with Sir Harold's son, Nicholas, Michael Mosley reported on the "Eureka moment" that led to the invention of the intraocular lens. The film was made by ICON Films of Bristol.
