= Multifocal intraocular lens =

Implanted lens in the eye allowing reasonable focus for a range of distances

Multifocal and accommodating intraocular lenses are artificial intraocular lenses (IOLs) that are designed to provide focus of both distance and near objects, in contrast to monofocal intraocular lenses which only have one focal point and correct distance vision. The issue of restoring accommodation following cataract surgery or through refractive lens exchange is becoming an increasingly important topic in ophthalmology. Intraocular lenses that correct presbyopia are divided into two main categories:

- Multifocal IOLs: achieve near and distance vision by having two (bifocal) or three (trifocal) focal points simultaneously. The function of multifocal IOL depends on the pupil size for refractive types. The concept is based on the principle that the pupil tends to constrict for near tasks, so the central portion of the lens is designed for near and the outer portion for distance. For diffractive types of multifocal IOLs, light is split by diffraction and the vision is pupil independent. However, the physics behind a diffractive IOL appears different from the well-known diffraction at the edges or corners of an obstacle. The property of a diffractive IOL in focusing light is explained by Snell's law of refraction on micro prisms ordered in concentric rings. The interference of diffracted light at the edges may reduce the quality of the image, but it does not play a role in the image formation of a diffractive IOL. Therefore, the term "diffractive" could be misleading in this context.
- Accommodating IOLs: change in shape and power when the ciliary muscle contracts and give an advantage over regular IOLs.

== Evidence about different lenses ==
Monofocal lenses are standard lenses used in cataract surgery. People who have a multifocal intraocular lens after their cataract is removed may be less likely to need additional glasses compared with people who have standard monofocal lenses. People receiving multifocal lenses may experience more visual problems, such as glare or haloes (rings around lights), than with monofocal lenses.

People receiving accommodative intraocular lenses had improvements in near vision but these improvements were small and reduced over time. People who received accommodative intraocular lenses may have a higher risk of thickening and clouding of the tissue behind the intraocular lenses (posterior capsule opacification) but there is some uncertainty around this finding.
