= Rayner (company) =

Medical equipment manufacturing company

Rayner designs and manufactures intraocular lenses and proprietary injection devices for use in cataract surgery. With Sir Harold Ridley, they were pioneers in the field from 1949 when Ridley successfully implanted the first intraocular lens (IOL) at St Thomas' Hospital, London.

== The origin of the company ==
The story of the Rayner Company begins in 1910, when Mr John Baptiste Reiner and Mr Charles Davis Keeler opened their first optician's shop at No 9, Vere Street, London, England. They registered their company as Reiner & Keeler Ltd on 30 October 1910. Before forming the company, J.B. Reiner had completed an apprenticeship in 'the art of an optician and scientific instrument maker' in 1891 and had gone on to work for E.B. Merrowitz Ltd, a branch of a well-known American optical company.

In 1915, during the First World War, the company name was changed to Rayner & Keeler Ltd. This was almost certainly a commercial decision of the time as J. B. Reiner retained his name all his life.

The two founding directors separated in 1917 when C. D. Keeler resigned and severed all his interests with the company.

== The first intraocular lens and Rayner's association with Ridley ==
In 1948, Mr Harold Ridley, consultant ophthalmologist at St Thomas' Hospital and Moorfields Eye Hospital, London, together with John Pike of Rayner met privately to discuss a new project. Pike, a director of Rayner and their senior optical specialist, had assisted Ridley with several projects, most recently on the development of electronic ophthalmoscopy. Ridley called his new project the artificial lenticulus project and asked Pike for Rayner's help in the design and manufacture of an implantable lens.

In David Apple's article from the January 1996 issue of Survey of Ophthalmology, Ridley recalls "... After months of secret thought, I called my friend John Pike, the optical scientist at Rayners of London with whom I had recently worked on electronic ophthalmoscopy. I suggested that we meet in my car after completing our routine duties that day. So it came about that two men sitting in a car in Cavendish Square one evening devised all the principles of a new operation."

Perspex was chosen as the preferred material because of its lightness in weight and good optical properties. Also observations during the war of eye injuries to RAF personnel had shown that Perspex appeared inert within body tissues. Perspex was registered in 1934 by ICI as the trademark for their polymethylmethacrylate acrylic sheet. In the late 1930s, as a result of Britain's rearmament programme, ICI's total production of Perspex was reserved for the aircraft industry and the material was specifically developed for the use of fighter aircraft. The required properties of transparency, strength and resistance to heat demanded a high degree of purity and polymerisation. The postwar commercial development of Perspex had resulted in a quite different material from that of the war years but, to ICI's credit, led by Dr John Holt they again produced the high-quality fighter aircraft Perspex which they called Transpex I.

On 29 November 1949, at St Thomas' Hospital, London, Ridley performed the first IOL operation on the eye of a 45-year-old female patient. The operation was conducted in secret, done in two stages with the artificial lens permanently implanted three months later.

== Rayner in the United States ==
In 1952 the first IOL implant was performed in the United States: a Ridley-Rayner lens was implanted at the Wills Eye Hospital in Philadelphia. Surgeons Turgut Hamdi MD and Warren Reese MD implanted a series of these lenses – some with good visual function results (reported in a review by Dr Charles Letocha in the Journal of Cataract and Refractive Surgery in 1999).

A lens designed by Ridely's pupil Peter Choyce was the first to be approved as "safe and effective" and approved for use in the US by the Food and Drug Administration in 1981. These first FDA-approved lenses, (Choyce Mark VIII and Choyce Mark IX Anterior Chamber lenses) were manufactured by Rayner.

The Rayner C-flex injectable IOL is approved since May 2007 by the FDA.

== Developments in the 21st century ==
On 21 April 2009 the prestigious Queen's Award for Enterprise was awarded to Rayner Intraocular Lenses Limited in recognition of sustained international trade in overseas markets. Also in 2009 Rayner celebrated 60 years of continuous manufacturing and sales of intraocular lenses.

Rayner is the only British manufacturer of IOLs: all its intraocular lenses were made at its Sackville Road manufacturing facility in Hove, East Sussex until May 2017, when the company moved into a new global HQ and manufacturing facility in Worthing, West Sussex. The new building was named the Ridley Innovation Centre. The plant includes a new generation of manufacturing equipment from companies such as GB Innomech to improve process efficiencies and more than double manufacturing capacity.

On 1 February 2014 the High Street retail business of Rayner Opticians was bought by Vision Express from JBR1910 Limited.

== See also ==
- Harold Ridley (ophthalmologist)
- Intraocular lens
- David J. Apple
