= Intraocular lens =

Lens implanted in the eye to treat cataracts and/or myopia or hyperopia

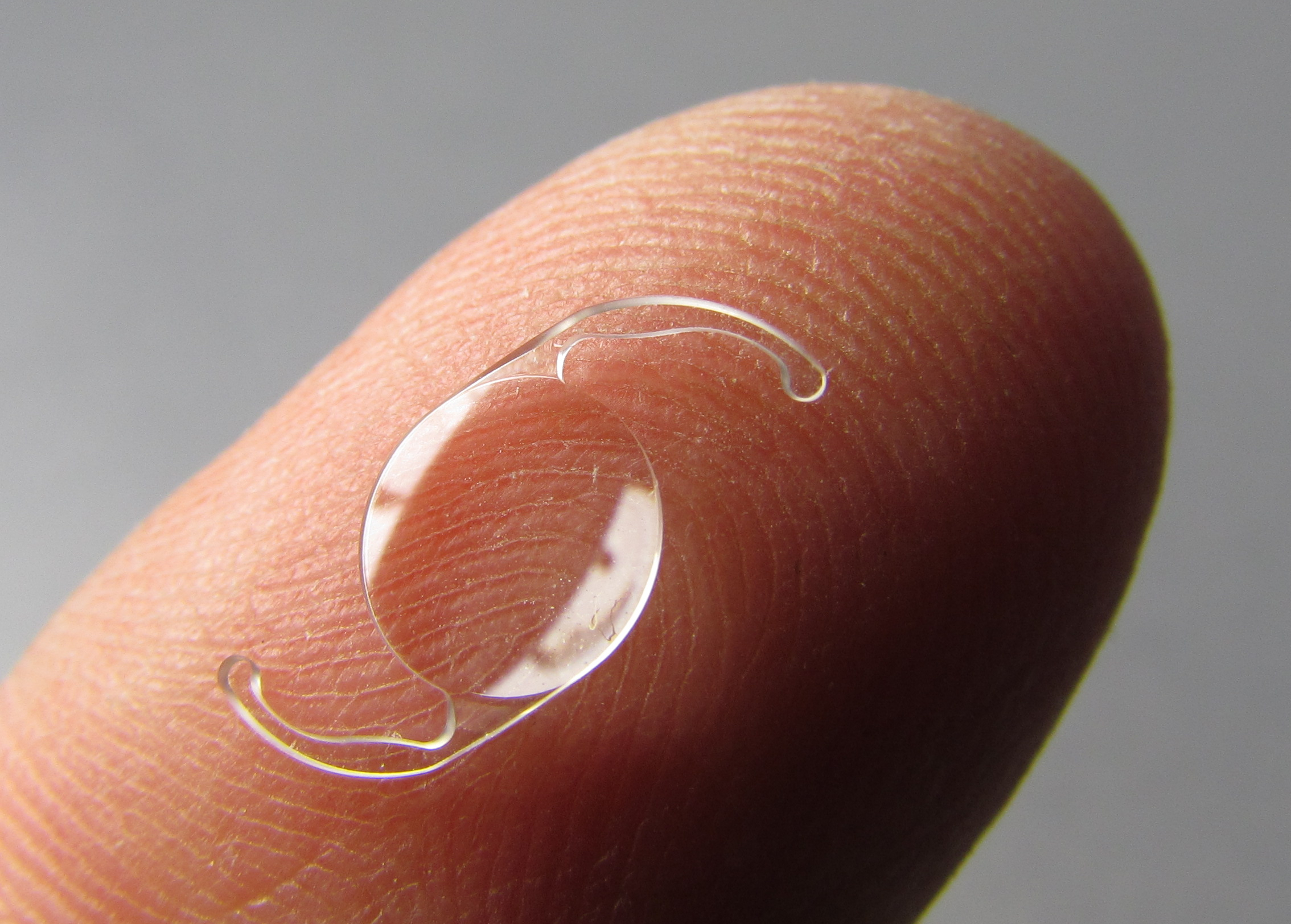
- A posterior chamber IOL (with haptics)
- ICD-9-CM: 13.72
- MeSH: D054120
- OPS-301 code: 5-984

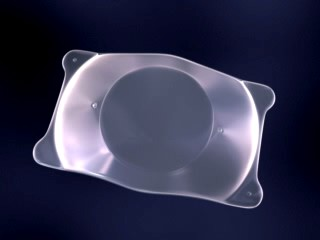
A phakic IOL

An intraocular lens (IOL) is a lens implanted in the eye usually as part of a treatment for cataracts or for correcting other vision problems such as near-sightedness (myopia) and far-sightedness (hyperopia); a form of refractive surgery. If the natural lens is left in the eye, the IOL is known as phakic, otherwise it is a pseudophakic lens (or false lens). Both kinds of IOLs are designed to provide the same light-focusing function as the natural crystalline lens. This can be an alternative to LASIK, but LASIK is not an alternative to an IOL for treatment of cataracts.

IOLs usually consist of a small plastic lens with plastic side struts, called haptics, to hold the lens in place in the capsular bag inside the eye. IOLs were originally made of a rigid material (PMMA), although this has largely been superseded by the use of flexible materials, such as silicone. Most IOLs fitted today are fixed monofocal lenses matched to distance vision. However, other types are available, such as a multifocal intraocular lens that provides multiple-focused vision at far and reading distance, and adaptive IOLs that provide limited visual accommodation. Multifocal IOLs can also be trifocal IOLs or extended depth of focus (EDOF) lenses.

As of 2021, nearly 28 million cataract procedures took place annually worldwide. That is about 75,000 procedures per day globally. The procedure can be done under local or topical anesthesia with the patient awake throughout the operation. The use of a flexible IOL enables the lens to be rolled for insertion into the capsular bag through a very small incision, thus avoiding the need for stitches. This procedure usually takes less than 30 minutes in the hands of an experienced ophthalmologist, and the recovery period is about two to three weeks. After surgery, patients should avoid strenuous exercise or anything else that significantly increases blood pressure. They should visit their ophthalmologists regularly for three weeks to monitor the implants.

IOL implantation carries several risks associated with eye surgeries, such as infection, loosening of the lens, lens rotation, inflammation, nighttime halos and retinal detachment. Though IOLs enable many patients to have reduced dependence on glasses, most patients still rely on glasses for certain activities, such as reading. These reading glasses may be avoided in some cases if multifocal IOLs, trifocal IOLs or EDOF lenses are used.

== Medical uses ==
Intraocular lenses have been used since 1999 for correcting larger errors in near-sighted, far-sighted, and astigmatic eyes. This type of IOL is also called phakic intraocular lens (PIOL), as it is implanted without removing the patient's natural crystalline lens.

Phakic IOLs appear to be lower risk than excimer laser surgery (LASIK) in those with significant near-sightedness.

More commonly, IOLs are implanted via Clear Lens Extraction And Replacement (CLEAR) surgery, also known as refractive lens exchange (RLE) or clear lens extraction (CLE). During CLEAR, the crystalline lens is extracted and an IOL replaces it in a process that is very similar to cataract surgery: both involve lens replacement, local anesthesia, last approximately 30 minutes, and require making a small incision in the eye for lens insertion. People recover from CLEAR surgery 1–7 days after the operation. During this time, they should avoid strenuous exercise or anything else that significantly raises blood pressure. They should visit their ophthalmologists regularly for several weeks to monitor the IOL implants.

CLEAR has a 90% success rate (risks include wound leakage, infection, inflammation, and astigmatism). CLEAR can be performed only on patients ages 40 and older. This is to ensure that eye growth, which disrupts IOL lenses, will not occur post-surgery.

Once implanted, IOLs have three major benefits. First, they are an alternative to the excimer laser procedure (LASIK), a form of eye surgery that does not work for people with serious vision problems. Effective IOL implants also eliminate the need for glasses or contact lenses post-surgery for most patients. Cataracts will not appear or return, as the lens has been removed. The disadvantage is that the eye's ability to change focus (accommodate) has generally been reduced or eliminated, depending on the kind of lens implanted.

Some of the risks that were found in the early 2000s during a three-year study of the Artisan lenses were:

- a yearly loss of 1.8% of the endothelial cells,
- 0.6% risk of retinal detachment,
- 0.6% risk of cataract (other studies have shown a risk of 0.5–1.0%), and
- 0.4% risk of corneal swelling.

Other risks include:

- 0.03–0.05% eye infection risk, which in worst case can lead to blindness. (This risk exists in all eye surgery procedures and is not unique to IOLs.)
- glaucoma,
- astigmatism,
- remaining near- or far-sightedness,
- rotation of the lens inside the eye one or two days after surgery.

Toric IOLs must be of the correct power and aligned inside the eye on a meridian that counteracts the preexisting astigmatism. One of the causes of unsatisfactory refractory correction is that the lens may be incorrectly placed by the surgeon, or rotate inside the eye if is too short, which may occur if the eye was incorrectly measured, or because the sulcus has a slightly oval shape. If misaligned, preexisting astigmatism may not be corrected completely or may even increase.

When standard IOLs are implanted with a CLEAR procedure, in substitution of the patient's crystalline, astigmatism is typically not corrected, as astigmatism is mainly attributable to a deformation of the cornea. Toric IOLs may be used during the CLEAR procedure to correct astigmatism.

The surgeon can ascertain the astigmatic, or steepest, meridian in a number of ways, including manifest refraction or corneal topography. Manifest refraction is the familiar test where the eye doctor rotates lenses in front of the eye, asking the patient, "Which is better (or clearer), this one or this one?" Corneal topography is considered a more quantitative test, and for purposes of aligning a toric IOL, most surgeons use a measurement called simulated keratometry (SimK), which is calculated by the internal programming of the corneal topography machine, to determine the astigmatic meridian on the surface of the cornea. The astigmatic meridian can also be identified using corneal wavefront technology or paraxial curvature matching.

=== Indications for refractive lens exchange ===
Severe myopia or hyperopia with coexisting presbyopia are the primary indicators for refractive lens exchange (RLE), as RLE leads to complete loss of accommodation. Underlying regular astigmatism can also be managed by RLE, even beyond the scope of corneal incisional techniques, by toric lens implants. Marginal indications for RLE are presbyopia without ametropia, using a multifocal lens implant, presbyopia with underlying astigmatism, and prepresbyopoa hyperopia of from +5 to +10 D not amenable to keratorefractive surgery or phakic IOL due to a shallow anterior chamber.

==== Complications ====
Complications of RLE are similar to those after cataract surgery, but with the difference that RLE is often used in very short or very long eyes and patients' ages tend to be significantly lower, so consideration must be given to longer-term effects.

== Type of surgery ==
Implants can be used with or without removal of the natural crystalline lens:

- Phakia is the presence of the natural crystalline lenses. Phakic IOL (PIOL) refers to an intraocular lens implanted without removal of the original crystalline lens, and this is performed solely to correct refractive error.
- Aphakia is the absence of the natural crystalline lens. The aphakic state is usually due to surgery to remove a cataractous lens, but post-surgical aphakia is rare nowadays because of the ubiquity of intraocular lenses. Rarely, aphakia can be post-traumatic or congenital in nature. Aphakic IOL refers to a lens implanted secondarily in an eye already aphakic from previous surgery or trauma.
- Pseudophakia is the substitution of the natural crystalline lens with an IOL, as is often done after cataract extraction or less often to correct major refractive error. Pseudophakic IOL refers to a lens implanted during surgery, immediately after removal of the patient's crystalline lens.

Many aphakic and pseudophakic IOLs such as anterior chamber IOLs or 3-piece posterior chamber IOLs can be used interchangeably. The exception are one piece IOLs, which must be placed within the capsular bag at the time of cataract surgery and hence cannot be used as secondary implants.

=== Location of implant ===
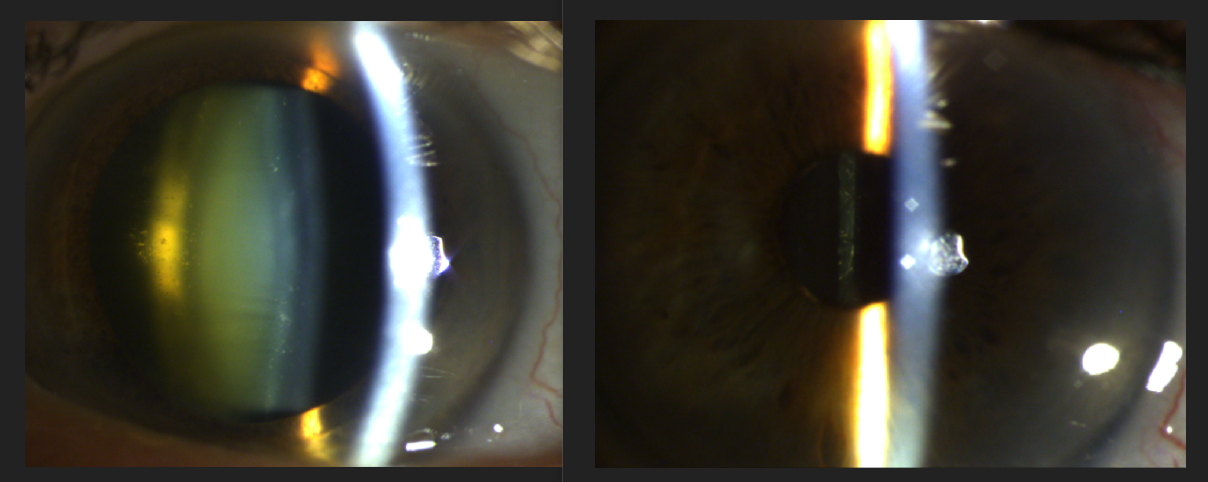
Before surgery (natural crystalline lens, left). After surgery (implanted PCIOL, right).

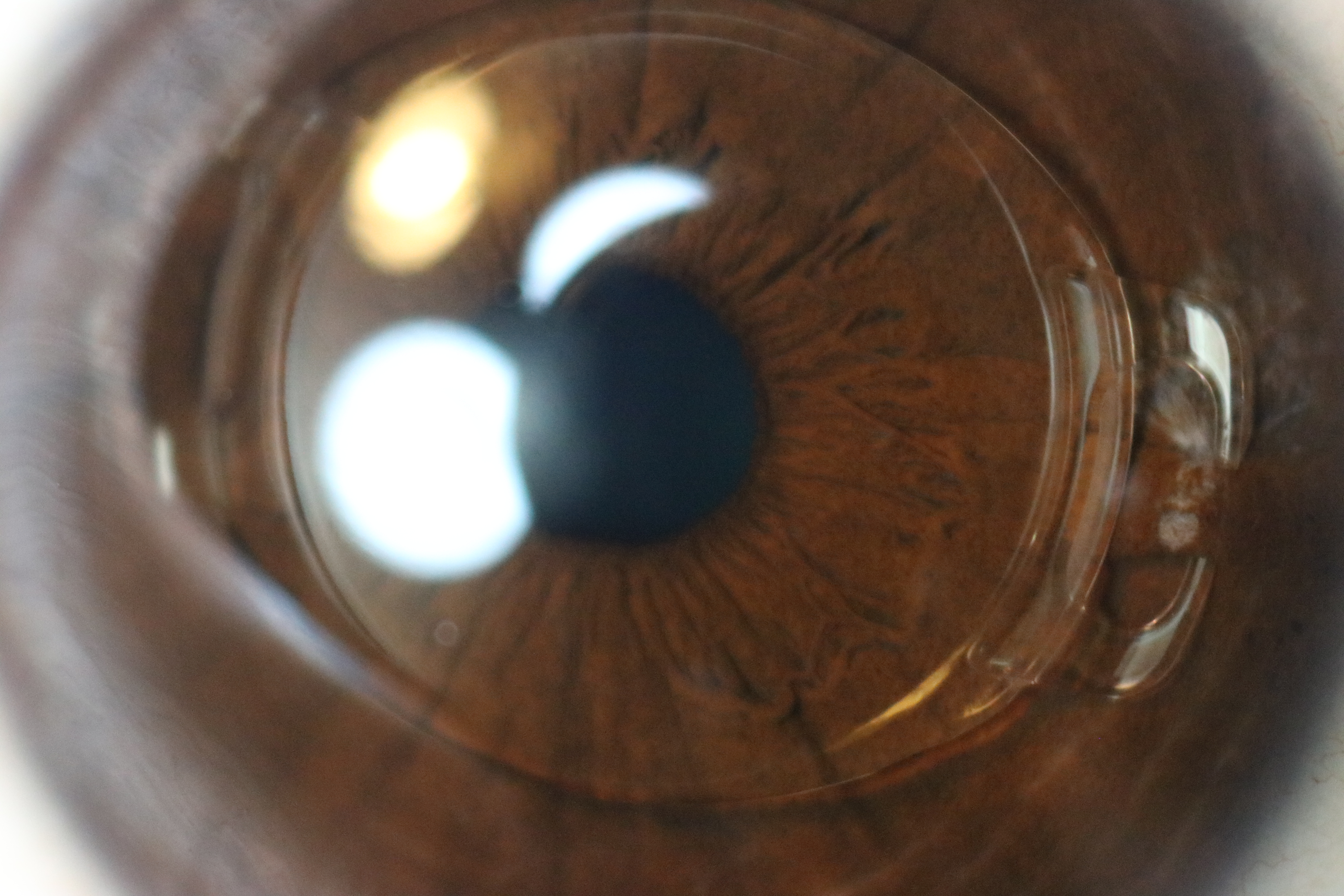
An anterior chamber IOL (ACIOL)

- Posterior chamber IOL (PCIOL). This is by far the most common type of implanted lens after cataract surgery, as this is the natural and optimum position for a lens.
- Anterior chamber IOL (ACIOL). A less-common type of intraocular lens, which is sometimes used if a PCIOL is not an option for a patient or if the situation requires a phakic IOL (PIOL).

== Pseudophakic IOLs ==
Diagram of the different types of intraocular lenses

Pseudophakic IOLs are lenses implanted during surgery, immediately after removal of the patient's crystalline lens.

=== Monofocal ===
Monofocal IOLs are standard lenses used in cataract surgery. One of the major disadvantages of these conventional IOLs is that they can only be focused for one particular distance – either optical infinity (rendering the eye emmetropic) or a fixed finite distance (rendering the eye myopic). Patients who undergo a standard IOL implantation no longer experience clouding from cataracts, but they are unable to accommodate (change focus from near to far, far to near, and to distances in between). This is not a concern for most cataract surgeries, as they are primarily performed on elderly people that are already completely presbyopic. However, it can be a problem for patients that are not yet presbyopic (or are in the early stages of presbyopia) undergoing refractive lens exchange for the sake of correcting refractive errors. Monovision, in which one eye is made emmetropic and the other myopic, can partially compensate for the loss of accommodation and enable clear vision at multiple distances. More versatile types of lenses (multifocal and accommodating IOLs) were introduced in 2003 in the United States, with the approval by the Food and Drug Administration. These come at an additional cost to the recipient beyond what Medicare will pay and each has advantages and disadvantages.

=== Multifocal ===
Multifocal IOLs attempt to provide simultaneous viewing of distance vision and near vision. Trifocal IOLs can provide intermediate vision in addition. Many multifocal IOL designs attempt to achieve this simultaneous viewing focus using a concentric ring design, which alternates distance and near focal points. However, concentric ring multifocal lenses are prone to glare and mildly compromised focus at all ranges of vision.

People who have a multifocal IOL after their cataract is removed may be less likely to need additional glasses compared with people who have standard monofocal lenses. However, people receiving multifocal lenses may experience more visual problems than with monofocal lenses. The most common adverse visual effects from multifocal IOLs include glare, halos (rings around lights), and a loss of contrast sensitivity in low-light conditions.

=== Adjustable lens ===
An adjustable IOL is unlike any other lens as its prescription power can be adjusted after surgery once all healing is complete. All other IOLs require surgeons to use pre-surgery measurements to determine a patient's post-surgery lens power. The drawback of this is that pre-surgery measurements are taken while a patient still has cataracts, and they cannot account for minuscule shifts that occur during healing. An adjustable IOL allows surgeons to implant it and then, once healing is complete, use an ultraviolet light delivery device to fine tune it until it suits the patient. An early example being the (RxSight) Light Adjustable Lens (LAL).

The eyes and lenses must not be exposed to random ultraviolet light before and during the adjustment process, and protective glasses must be worn from the operation until the lens is locked. When the eye has healed, which is usually 2 to 4 weeks after IOL implantation, refraction adjustment is done. A prescription is formulated for the patient and customization of the IOL's refractive power is done by exposing either the centre or the periphery of the lens to a metered dose of UV light, with the help of a contact lens on the cornea. This exposed part will swell slightly, adjusting the lens surface curvature. Meridional exposure can be done in much the same way to correct for astigmatism. Several exposures can be made for fine tuning, spaced over several days. Once the lens has been optimised a final exposure of the whole lens is made to lock the changes, after which the lens will no longer be adjustable and can be used outdoors.

=== Accommodating ===
Some newer lens designs attempt to allow the eye to regain some ability to change focus from distance to near (accommodation). However, many accommodating IOLs used today only achieve very limited improvements in near vision which reduce over time. Accommodative intraocular lenses may also have a slightly higher risk of developing posterior capsule opacification (PCO), though there is some uncertainty around this finding. PCO is a common side-effect of many cataract surgeries and is easily treatable with a one-time laser capsulotomy procedure.

Accommodating IOLs interact with ciliary muscles and zonules, using hinges at both ends to "latch on" and move forward and backward inside the eye using the same nerves and musculature as normal accommodation. These IOLs have a 4.5-mm square-edged optic and a long-hinged plate design with polyimide loops at the end of the haptics. The hinges are made of an advanced silicone called BioSil that was thoroughly tested to make sure it was capable of unlimited flexing in the eye.

An accommodating lens made by Eyeonics, now Bausch & Lomb, was approved by the US FDA in 2003. The Crystalens has two hinged struts on opposite edges which displace the lens along the optical axis when an inward transverse force is applied to the haptic loops at the outer ends of the struts (the components transferring the movement of the contact points to the device), and it springs back when the force is reduced. It is implanted in the eye's lens capsule, where the contractions of the ciliary body which would focus the eye with the natural lens are used to focus the implant.

=== Toric ===
A toric IOL is a type of toric lens used to correct preexisting corneal astigmatism at the time of cataract surgery. Astigmatism can also be treated with limbal relaxing incisions or an excimer laser procedure. About 40% of Americans have significant astigmatism and thus may be candidates for a toric IOL. Cataract surgery with implantation of a toric IOL is essentially the same as cataract surgery with a conventional IOL. Like toric contact lenses, toric IOLs have different powers in different meridians of the lens, and they must be positioned on the correct meridian to reverse the preexisting astigmatism. If the toric IOL is not on the correct meridian, it may need to be repositioned in a second procedure.

=== Multifocal toric ===
Standard toric IOLs are monofocal, permanently focused on distant objects. Multifocal toric IOLs are also available. These lenses provide the patient not only with correction of preexisting astigmatism, but also with vision that can focus at far and short distances, including short reading distance.

=== Extended depth-of-focus ===
Extended depth-of-focus (EDOF) is an intraocular lens technology for treating presbyopia. Where multifocal IOLs have two or more focal points, EDOF lenses form a single elongated focal point to enhance depth of focus. The intention is to reduce glare, halos, and other photic phenomena which occur with multifocal IOLs. A possible drawback is decrease in image quality due to aberrations. EDOF IOLs have often been combined with multifocus designs, which has caused some confusion. It has been suggested that lenses combining more than one optical design be termed "hybrid IOLs".

The principle on which they work is to form a single, axially elongated focal point, unlike monofocal lenses which have a single focal point, and multifocal lenses which have two or more stacked discrete focal points. The elongated zone of focus is intended to prevent the overlapped out-of-focus images of the multifocal lens which cause the halo effect. When matched correctly to the eye, these lenses are intended to have little effect on distance vision, and improve middle distance and near vision. In practice they have been satisfactory for intermediate distances, but not good enough for near vision. Spherical aberration and the pinhole effect have been used to produce the elongated focal zone. In effect, accurate focus at any distance is compromised to achieve less noticeable blur at all distances.

== Phakic IOLs ==
Phakic IOLs (PIOLs) are intraocular lenses which are placed in an eye that still contains a natural human crystalline lens. PIOLs are sometimes referred to as an 'implantable contact lenses' (ICLs). As with other IOLs, PIOLs can be either spheric or toric. Toric PIOLs have to be aligned with the meridian of astigmatism; toric IOL misalignment or rotation can lead to residual or even greater astigmatism postoperatively.

Depending on their attachment site to the eye, PIOLs can be divided into three categories:

- Angle-supported PIOLs, placed in the anterior chamber. They are notorious for their negative impact on the corneal endothelial lining, which is vital for maintaining a healthy clear cornea.
- Iris-fixated PIOLs, attached by claws to the mid-peripheral iris by a technique called enclavation. It is believed to have a lesser effect on corneal endothelium. The main complication with this type is their tendency to cause endothelial cell reduction.
- Sulcus-supported PIOLs, placed in the posterior chamber in front of the natural crystalline lens. This type of PIOLs is gaining more and more popularity. They have special vaulting so as not to be in contact with the normal lens. The main complication with older versions was a small possibility of cataract formation.

In 2006, a centrally perforated ICL (i.e., the Hole-ICL) was created to improve aqueous humour circulation.

== Blue-light filtering IOLs ==
Blue-light filtering IOLs filter the UV and high-energy blue light present in natural and artificial light, both of which can cause vision problems; however, too much filtering of blue light can increase depression, especially in the winter months (SAD). The trademarked "Natural Yellow" material is available in three hydrophilic IOLs. Dr. Patrick H. Benz of Benz Research and Development created the first IOL material to incorporate the same UV-A blocking and violet light filtering chromophore that's present in the human crystalline lens in order to attempt to protect the retina after cataract extraction of the natural crystalline lens.

A Cochrane Review found little evidence of important differences between blue‐light filtering and non‐blue‐light filtering lenses for protecting the macula (back of the eye) after cataract surgery. This may have been due to studies being too small and too short‐term to provide reliable results.

== Posterior capsule opacification ==
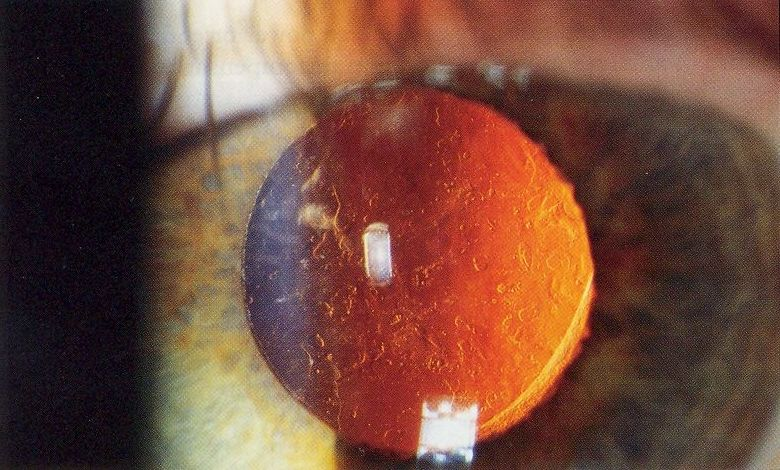
A posterior capsular opacity (PCO) around a posterior chamber IOL (as seen on retroillumination in a slit lamp)

Posterior capsule opacification (PCO), often referred to as "after cataract", is the most common complication of cataract surgery.

In a large percentage of patients (20-40%), posterior chamber intraocular lenses may form PCOs a few months after implantation. They are easily treatable, and typically only require a one-time capsulotomy procedure (using a Nd:YAG laser) to clarify.

== Materials ==
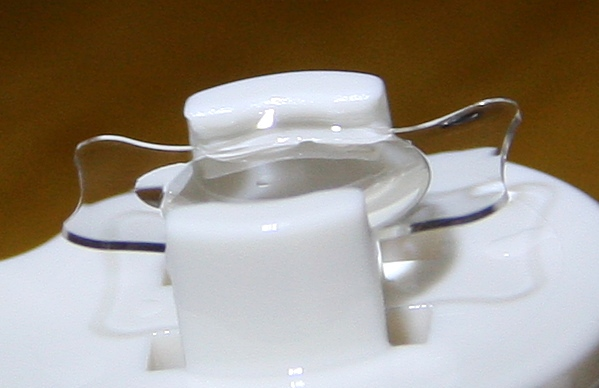
Acrylic MICS-IOL in holder

The materials that have been used to manufacture intraocular lens implants include poly(methyl methacrylate) (PMMA), silicone, hydrophobic acrylate, hydrophilic acrylate and collamer. PMMA was the first material to be used successfully in intraocular lenses.

Advances in technology have brought about the use of silicone and acrylic polymers, both of which are soft foldable inert materials. This allows the lens to be folded and inserted into the eye through a smaller incision. Specifically, acrylic lenses are a better choice in people who have a history of uveitis or are likely to have to undergo retinal surgery requiring vitrectomy with replacement by silicone oil, such as persons with proliferative diabetic retinopathy or who are at high risk of retinal detachment, such as persons with high myopia. A study found that in participants with a history of uveitis, eyes treated with hydrophobic acrylic IOLs were over twice as likely to have a best corrected visual acuity of 20/40 or more, compared to eyes treated with silicone IOLs.

== Selection of refractive power ==
The appropriate refractive power of the IOL is selected, much like a spectacle lens prescription, to provide the desired refractive outcome. Pre-operative measurements, including corneal curvature, axial length, and white-to-white measurements are used to estimate the required power of the IOL. These methods include several formulae, including Hagis, Hoffer Q, Holladay 1, Holladay 2, and SRK/T. Free online calculators use similar input data. A history of LASIK surgery requires different calculations to take this into account. Refractive results using power calculation formulae based on pre-operative biometrics leave people within 0.5 dioptres of target (correlates to visual acuity of 6/7.5 (20/25) when targeted for distance) in 55% of cases and within one dioptre (correlates to 6/12 (20/40) when targeted for distance) in 85% of cases. Developments in intra-operative wavefront technology have demonstrated power calculations that provide improved outcomes, yielding 80% of patients within 0.5 dioptres (7/7.5 (20/25) or better).

== History ==
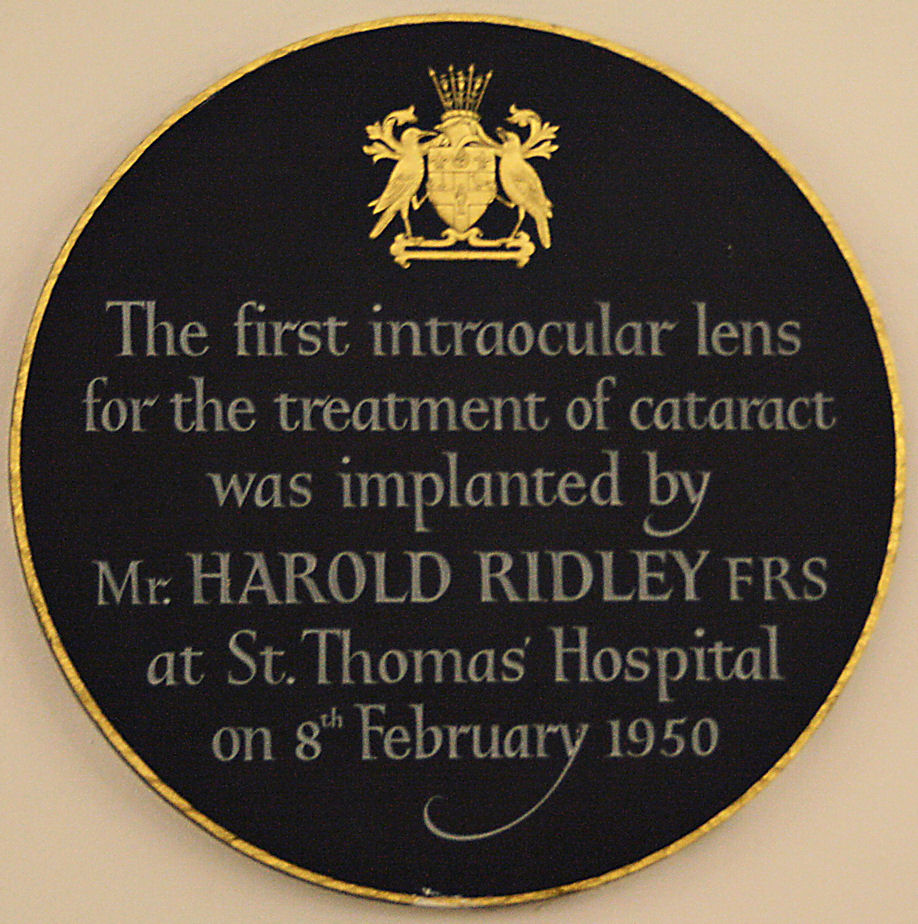
Plaque at St Thomas' Hospital – site of first permanent insertion of an intraocular lens, 8 February 1950

Johan Virgilius Casaamata (1741–1807) of Dresden had unsuccessfully attempted to place a glass intraocular lens after cataract surgery by January 1797. When writing his memoirs in the 1790s, Giacomo Casanova likely heard of Casaamata's attempt, because Casanova falsely claimed that oculist Felice Tadini told him the idea of intraocular lenses in Warsaw in 1766, but Casanova's claim is false, because Tadini was in Constantinople in 1766. Sir Harold Ridley was the first to successfully implant an intraocular lens on 29 November 1949, at St Thomas' Hospital at London. That lens was manufactured by the Rayner company of Brighton, East Sussex, England from Perspex CQ polymethylmethacrylate (PMMA) made by ICI (Imperial Chemical Industries). Ridley had observed that Royal Air Force pilots who sustained eye injuries during World War II involving PMMA windshield material did not show any rejection or foreign body reaction, and deduced that the transparent material was inert and useful for implantation in the eye.

The intraocular lens did not find widespread acceptance in cataract surgery until the 1970s, when further developments in lens design and surgical techniques had come about.

As of 2021, nearly 28 million cataract surgeries were performed worldwide, with 4 million in the U.S. alone. That translates to roughly 60,000 procedures every day.

== Makers of IOLs ==
- Alcon (US)
- Eyekon (US)
- Bausch & Lomb (US)
- Johnson & Johnson (US)
- Rayner (UK)
- Morcher (Germany)
- ZEISS (Germany)

== See also ==
- Adjustable-focus eyeglasses – Eyeglasses with manually adjustable focal length
- Aphakia – Absence of the lens of the eye
- Contact lens – Lenses placed on the eye's surface
- Capsulorhexis – Tearing an opening in the lens capsule during cataract surgery
- Cataract surgery – Removal of opacified lens from the eye
- IOLVIP – Intraocular lens system to compensate for macular degeneration
- Phacoemulsification – Method of cataract surgery
- Uveitis–glaucoma–hyphema syndrome – Complication of cataract surgery
