= Eye surgery =

Surgery performed on the eye or its adnexa

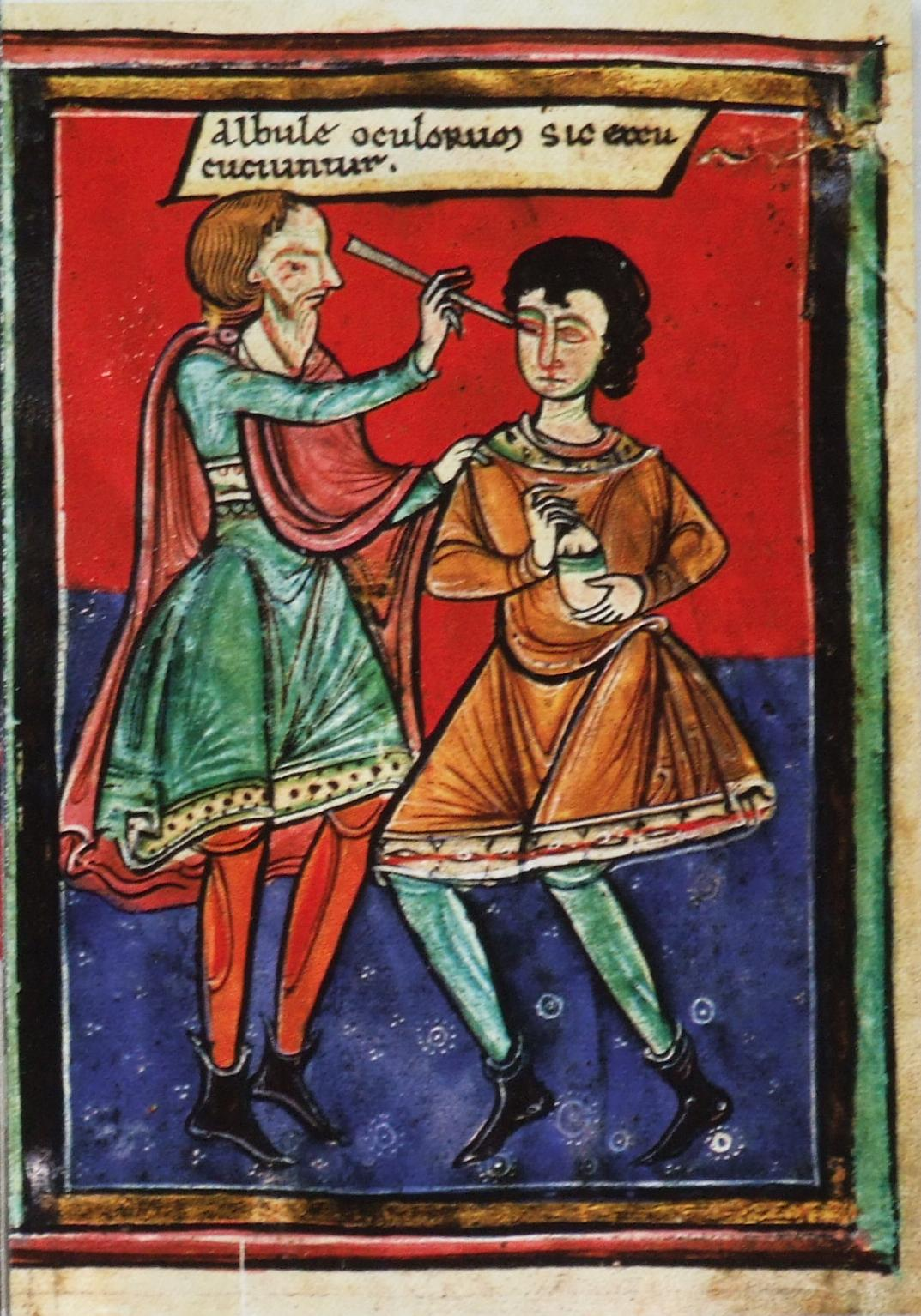
- Eye surgery in the Middle Ages
- ICD-10-PCS: 08
- ICD-9-CM: 08-16
- MeSH: D013508
- OPS-301 code: 5-08...5-16

Ophthalmologic surgeon, ophthalmologist, eye surgeon
Occupation
- Names: Physician; Surgeon
- Occupation type: Specialty
- Activity sectors: Medicine, surgery

Description
- Education required: Doctor of Medicine (M.D.); Doctor of Osteopathic medicine (D.O.); Bachelor of Medicine, Bachelor of Surgery (M.B.B.S.); Bachelor of Medicine, Bachelor of Surgery (MBChB)
- Fields of employment: Hospitals, clinics

Eye surgery, also known as ophthalmic surgery or ocular surgery, is surgery performed on the eye or its adnexa. Eye surgery is part of ophthalmology and is performed by an ophthalmologist or eye surgeon. The eye is a fragile organ, and requires due care before, during, and after a surgical procedure to minimize or prevent further damage. An eye surgeon is responsible for selecting the appropriate surgical procedure for the patient, and for taking the necessary safety precautions. Mentions of eye surgery can be found in several ancient texts dating back as early as 1800 BC, with cataract treatment starting in the fifth century BC. It continues to be a widely practiced class of surgery, with various techniques having been developed for treating eye problems.

== Preparation and precautions ==
Since the eye is heavily supplied by nerves, anesthesia is essential. Local anesthesia is most commonly used. Topical anesthesia using lidocaine topical gel is often used for quick procedures. Since topical anesthesia requires cooperation from the patient, general anesthesia is often used for children, traumatic eye injuries, or major orbitotomies, and for apprehensive patients. The physician administering anesthesia, or a nurse anesthetist or anesthetist assistant with expertise in anesthesia of the eye, monitors the patient's cardiovascular status. Sterile precautions are taken to prepare the area for surgery and lower the risk of infection. These precautions include the use of antiseptics, such as povidone-iodine, and sterile drapes, gowns, and gloves.

== Laser eye surgery ==
Although the terms laser eye surgery and refractive surgery are commonly used as if they were interchangeable, this is not the case. Lasers may be used to treat nonrefractive conditions (e.g. to seal a retinal tear). Laser eye surgery or laser corneal surgery is a medical procedure that uses a laser to reshape the surface of the eye to correct myopia (short-sightedness), hypermetropia (long-sightedness), and astigmatism (uneven curvature of the eye's surface). Importantly, refractive surgery is not compatible with everyone, and people may find on occasion that eyewear is still needed after surgery. Recent developments also include procedures that can change eye color from brown to blue. Before proceeding with laser surgery, the eye specialist needs to certify that the patient is a suitable candidate for the surgery and there are several factors to be considered before doing laser surgery.

== Cataract surgery ==
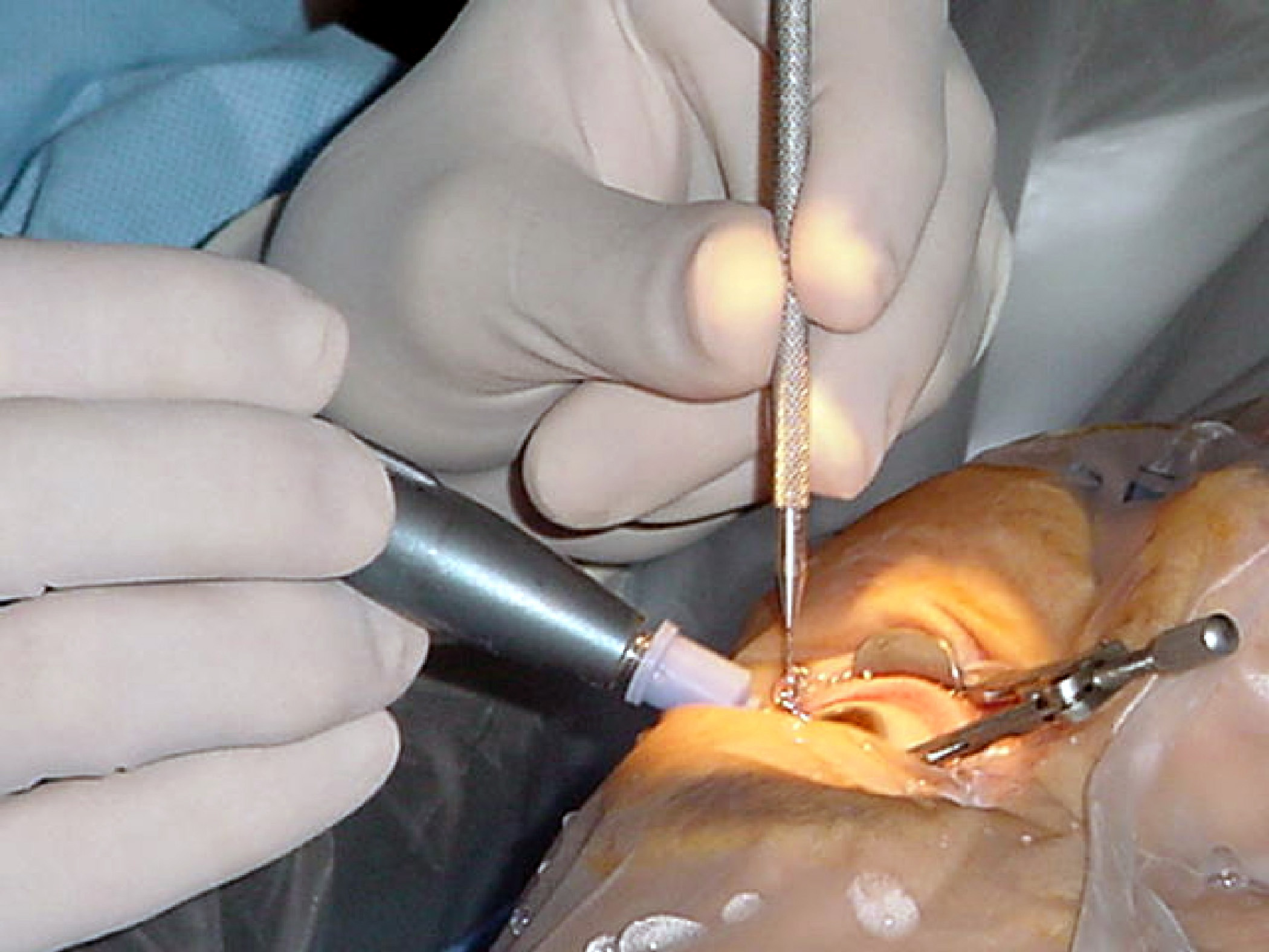
Cataract surgery, using a temporal approach phacoemulsification probe (in right hand) and "chopper" (in left hand) being done under operating microscope at a Navy medical center

A cataract is an opacification or cloudiness of the eye's crystalline lens due to aging, radiation, disease, or trauma that typically prevents light from forming a clear image on the retina. If visual loss is significant, surgical removal of the lens may be warranted, with lost optical power and preoperative refractive power usually replaced with an implantable intraocular lens. Owing to the high prevalence of cataracts, cataract extraction is the most common eye surgery. Rest after surgery is recommended.

== Glaucoma surgery ==
Glaucoma is a group of diseases affecting the optic nerve that results in vision loss and is frequently characterized by raised intraocular pressure. Many types of glaucoma surgery exist, and variations or combinations of those types can facilitate the escape of excess aqueous humor from the eye to lower intraocular pressure, and a few that lower it by decreasing the production of aqueous humor.

== Refractive surgery ==
Refractive surgery aims to correct errors of refraction in the eye, reducing or eliminating the need for corrective lenses.

- Keratomileusis is a method of reshaping the corneal surface to change its optical power. A disc of the cornea is shaved off, quickly frozen, lathe-ground, then returned to its original power.
- Automated lamellar keratoplasty
- Laser-assisted in situ keratomileusis (LASIK)
- Laser assisted subepithelial keratomileusis (LASEK), a.k.a. Epi-LASIK
- Photorefractive keratectomy
- Laser thermal keratoplasty
- Conductive keratoplasty uses radio-frequency waves to shrink corneal collagen. It is used to treat mild to moderate hyperopia.
- Limbal relaxing incisions can correct minor astigmatism
- Astigmatic keratotomy, arcuate keratotomy, or transverse keratotomy
- Radial keratotomy
- Hexagonal keratotomy
- Epikeratophakia is the removal of the corneal epithelium and replacement with a lathe-cut corneal button.
- Intracorneal rings or corneal ring segments
- Implantable contact lenses
- Presbyopia reversal
- Anterior ciliary sclerotomy
- Scleral reinforcement surgery for the mitigation of degenerative myopia
- Small incision lenticule extraction

== Corneal surgery ==
Corneal surgery includes most refractive surgery, as well as:

- Corneal transplant surgery is used to remove a cloudy/diseased cornea and replace it with a clear donor cornea.
- Penetrating keratoplasty
- Keratoprosthesis
- Phototherapeutic keratectomy
- Pterygium excision
- Corneal tattooing
- Osteo-odonto-keratoprosthesis is surgery in which support for an artificial cornea is created from a tooth and its surrounding jawbone. This is a still-experimental procedure used for patients with severely damaged eyes, generally from burns.
- Eye color-change surgery through an iris implant, known as Brightocular, or the stripping away the top layer of eye pigment, known as the stroma procedure

== Vitreoretinal surgery ==
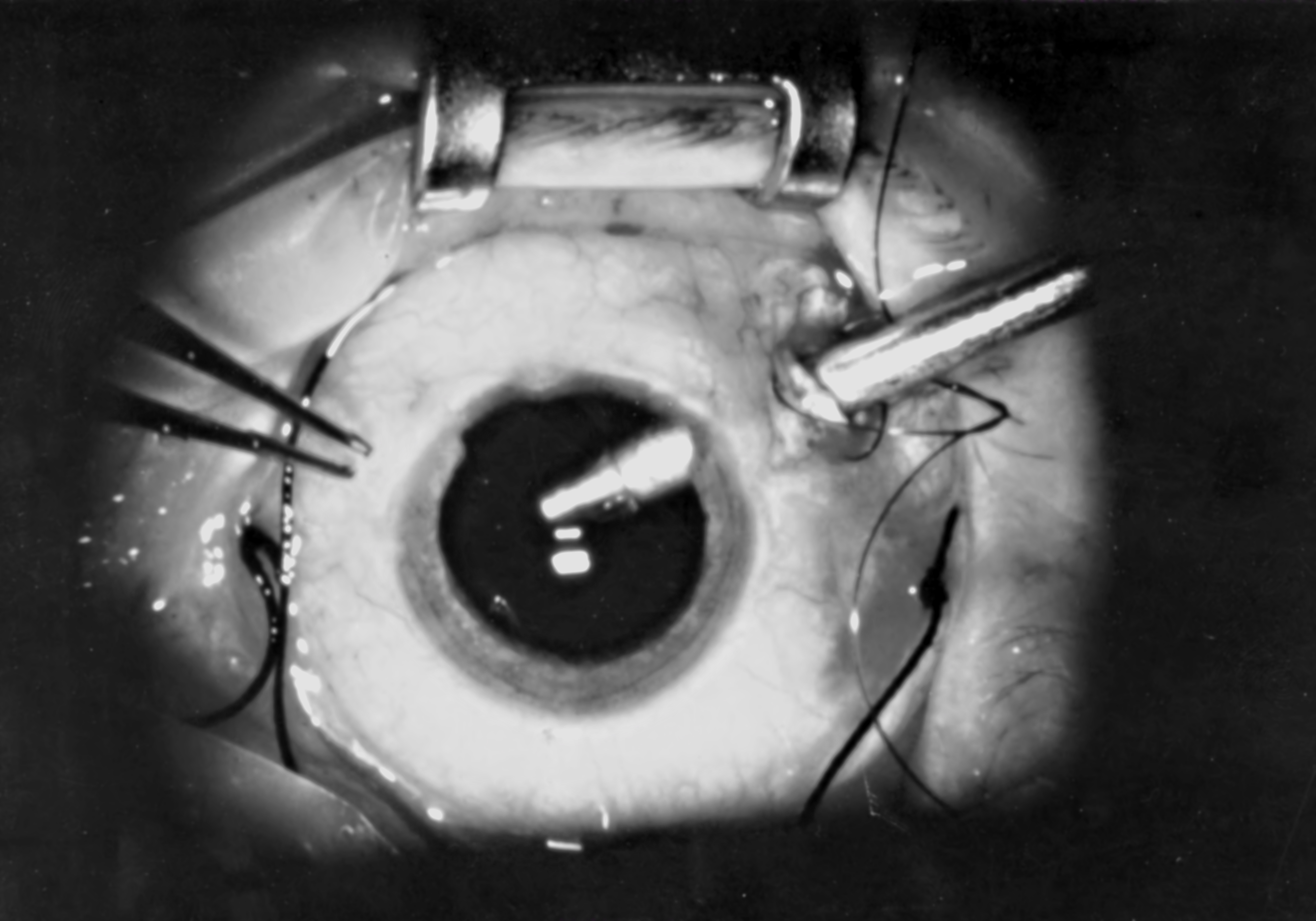
Vitrectomy

Vitreoretinal surgery includes:

- Vitrectomy
  - Anterior vitrectomy is the removal of the front portion of vitreous tissue. It is used for preventing or treating vitreous loss during cataract or corneal surgery, or to remove misplaced vitreous in conditions such as aphakia pupillary block glaucoma.
  - Pars plana vitrectomy or trans pars plana vitrectomy is a procedure to remove vitreous opacities and membranes through a pars plana incision. It is frequently combined with other intraocular procedures for the treatment of giant retinal tears, tractional retinal detachments, and posterior vitreous detachments.
- Pan retinal photocoagulation is a type of photocoagulation therapy used in the treatment of diabetic retinopathy.
- Retinal detachment repair
  - Ignipuncture is an obsolete procedure that involves cauterization of the retina with a very hot, pointed instrument.
  - A scleral buckle is used in the repair of a retinal detachment to indent or "buckle" the sclera inward, usually by sewing a piece of preserved sclera or silicone rubber to its surface.
  - Laser photocoagulation, or photocoagulation therapy, is the use of a laser to seal a retinal tear.
  - Pneumatic retinopexy
  - Retinal cryopexy, or retinal cryotherapy, is a procedure that uses intense cold to induce a chorioretinal scar and to destroy retinal or choroidal tissue.
- Macular hole repair
- Partial lamellar sclerouvectomy
- Partial lamellar sclerocyclochoroidectomy
- Partial lamellar sclerochoroidectomy
- Posterior sclerotomy is an opening made into the vitreous through the sclera, as for detached retina or the removal of a foreign body.
- Radial optic neurotomy
- Macular translocation surgery
  - through 360° retinotomy
  - through scleral imbrication technique

Vitreology is a historic term that deals exclusively with the health and disease of the vitreous body.

== Eye muscle surgery ==
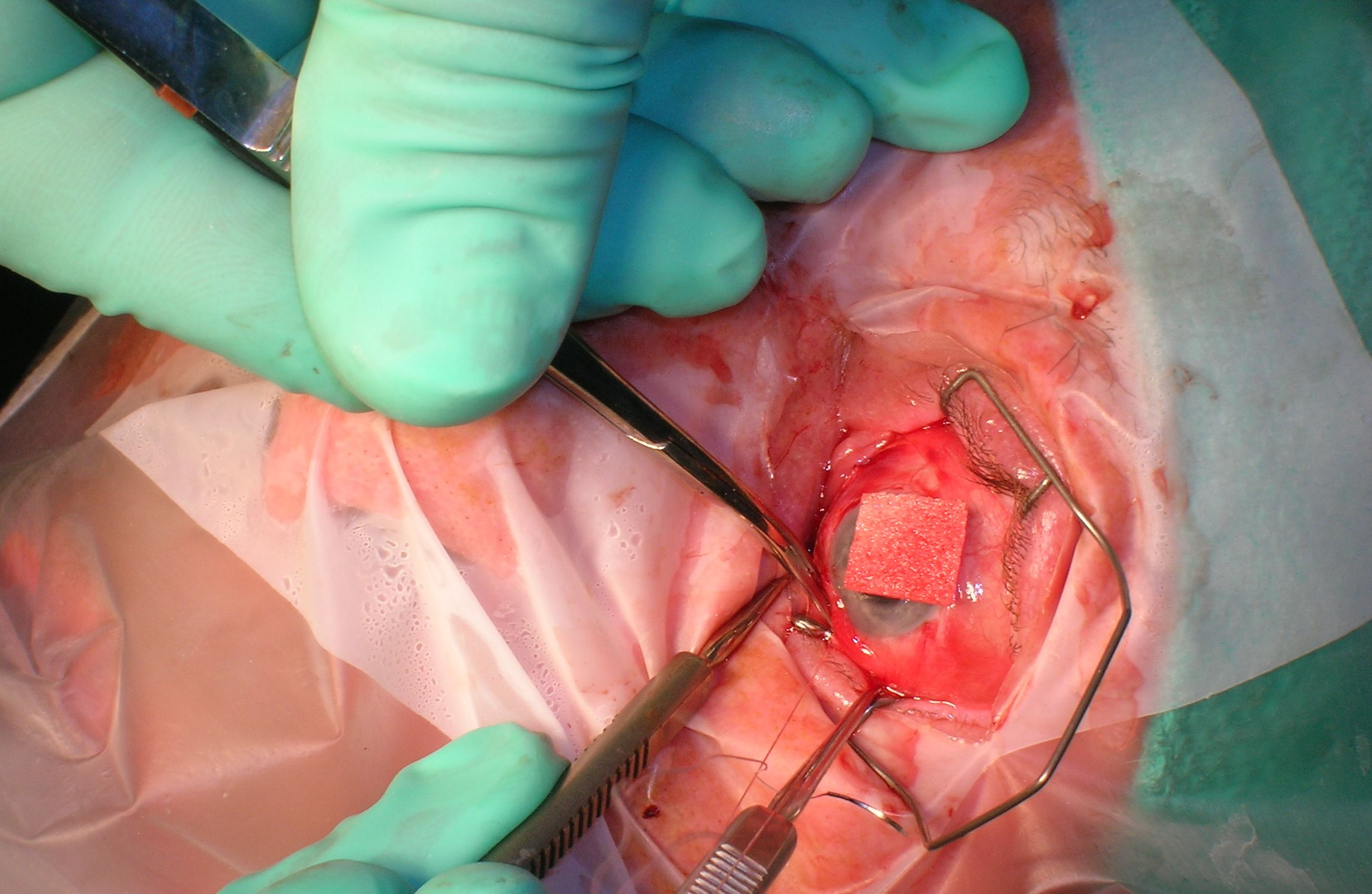
Isolating the inferior rectus muscle

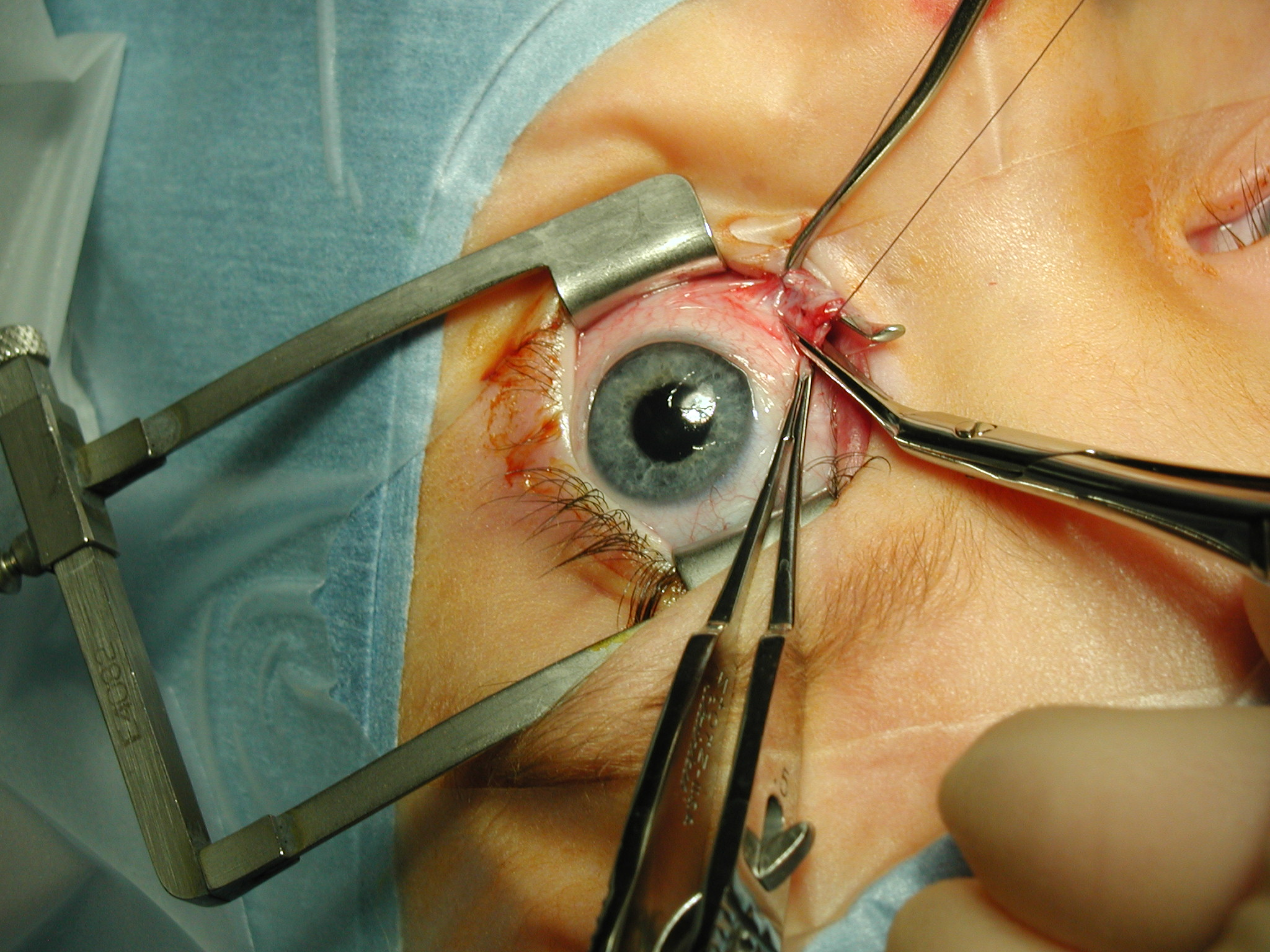
Disinserting the medial rectus muscle, after placing vicryl suture

With about 1.2 million procedures each year, extraocular muscle surgery is the third-most common eye surgery in the United States.

- Eye muscle surgery typically corrects strabismus and includes:
  - Loosening or weakening procedures
    - Recession involves moving the insertion of a muscle posteriorly towards its origin.
    - Myectomy
    - Myotomy
    - Tenectomy
    - Tenotomy
  - Tightening or strengthening procedures
    - Resection
    - Tucking
    - Advancement is the movement of an eye muscle from its original place of attachment on the eyeball to a more forward position.
  - Transposition or repositioning procedures
  - Adjustable suture surgery is a method of reattaching an extraocular muscle by means of a stitch that can be shortened or lengthened within the first postoperative day, to obtain better ocular alignment.

== Oculoplastic surgery ==
Oculoplastic surgery, or oculoplastics, is the subspecialty of ophthalmology that deals with the reconstruction of the eye and associated structures. Oculoplastic surgeons perform procedures such as the repair of droopy eyelids (blepharoplasty), repair of tear duct obstructions, orbital fracture repairs, removal of tumors in and around the eyes, and facial rejuvenation procedures including laser skin resurfacing, eye lifts, brow lifts, and even facelifts. Common procedures are:

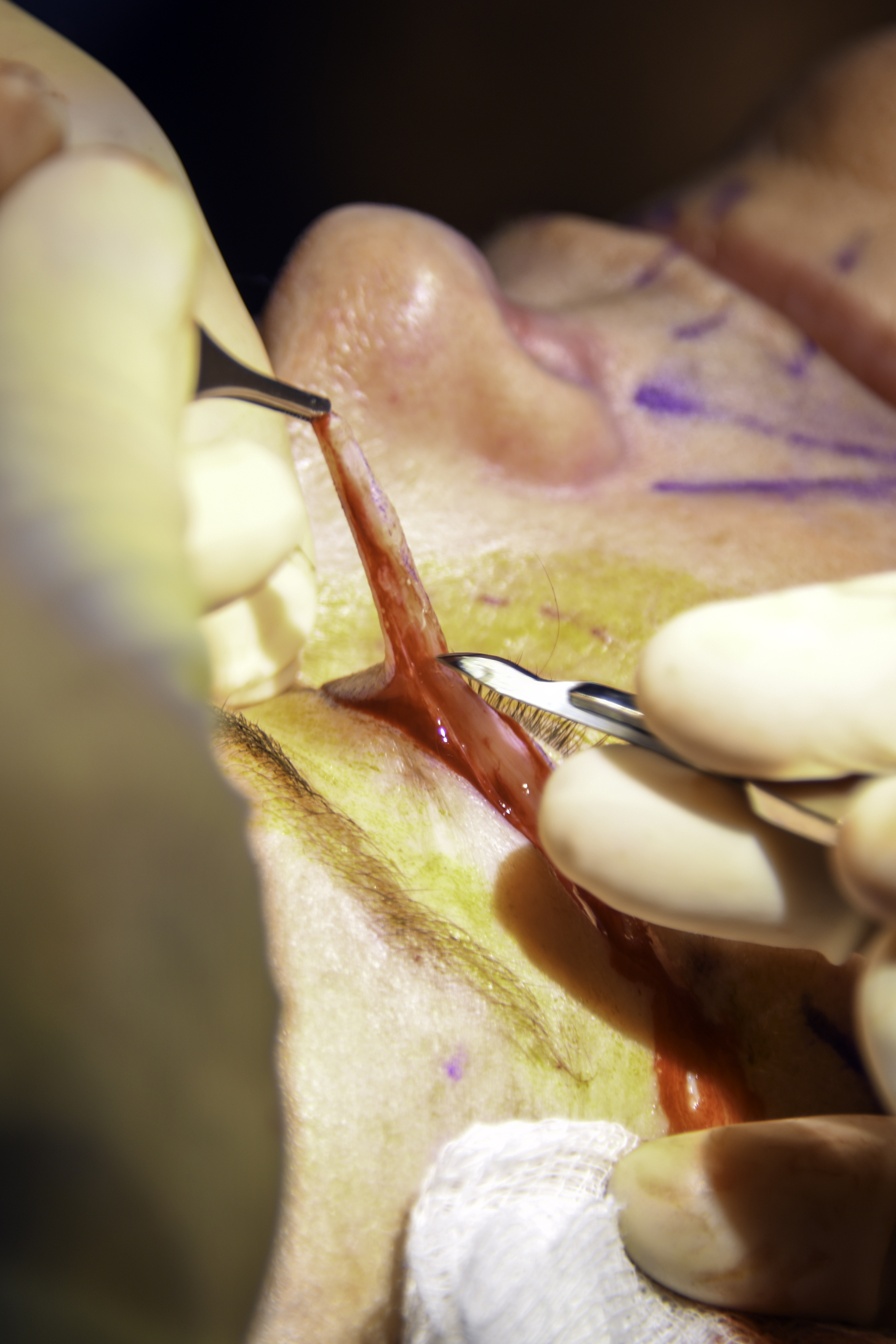
Intraoperative removal of excess upper eyelid skin during blepharoplasty

=== Eyelid surgery ===
- Blepharoplasty (eyelift) is plastic surgery of the eyelids to remove excessive skin or subcutaneous fat. East Asian blepharoplasty, also known as double eyelid surgery, is used to create a double eyelid crease for patients who have a single crease (monolid).
- Ptosis repair for droopy eyelid
  - Ectropion repair
- Entropion repair
- Canthal resection
  - A canthectomy is the surgical removal of tissue at the junction of the upper and lower eyelids.
  - Cantholysis is the surgical division of the canthus.
  - Canthopexy
  - A canthoplasty is plastic surgery at the canthus.
  - A canthorrhaphy is suturing of the outer canthus to shorten the palpebral fissure.
  - A canthotomy is the surgical division of the canthus, usually the outer canthus.
    - A lateral canthotomy is the surgical division of the outer canthus.
- Epicanthoplasty
- Tarsorrhaphy is a procedure in which the eyelids are partially sewn together to narrow the opening (i.e. palpebral fissure).

=== Orbital surgery ===
- Orbital reconstruction or ocular prosthetics (false eyes)
- Orbital decompression is used for Grave's disease, a condition (often associated with overactive thyroid problems) in which the eye muscles swell. Because the eye socket is bone, the swelling cannot be accommodated and as a result, the eye is pushed forward into a protruded position. In some patients, this is very pronounced. Orbitial decompression involves removing some bone from the eye socket to open up one or more sinuses and so make space for the swollen tissue and allowing the eye to move back into normal position.

=== Other oculoplastic surgery ===
- Botox injections
- Ultrapeel microdermabrasion
- Endoscopic forehead and browlift
- Face lift (rhytidectomy)
- Liposuction of the face and neck
- Browplasty

== Surgery involving the lacrimal apparatus ==
- A dacryocystorhinostomy or dacryocystorhinotomy is a procedure to restore the flow of tears into the nose from the lacrimal sac when the nasolacrimal duct does not function.
- Canaliculodacryocystostomy is a surgical correction for a congenitally blocked tear duct in which the closed segment is excised and the open end is joined to the lacrimal sac.
- Canaliculotomy involves slitting of the lacrimal punctum and canaliculus for the relief of epiphora
- A dacryoadenectomy is the surgical removal of a lacrimal gland.
- A dacryocystectomy is the surgical removal of a part of the lacrimal sac.
- A dacryocystostomy is an incision into the lacrimal sac, usually to promote drainage.
- A dacryocystotomy is an incision into the lacrimal sac.

== Eye removal ==
- An enucleation is the removal of the eye leaving the eye muscles and remaining orbital contents intact.
- An evisceration is the removal of the eye's contents, leaving the scleral shell intact. Usually performed to reduce pain in a blind eye.
- An exenteration is the removal of the entire orbital contents, including the eye, extraocular muscles, fat, and connective tissues; usually for malignant orbital tumors.

== Other surgery ==
Many of these described procedures are historical and are not recommended due to a risk of complications. Particularly, these include operations done on ciliary body in an attempt to control glaucoma, since highly safer surgeries for glaucoma, including lasers, nonpenetrating surgery, guarded filtration surgery, and seton valve implants have been invented.

- A ciliarotomy is a surgical division of the ciliary zone in the treatment of glaucoma.
- A ciliectomy is the surgical removal of part of the ciliary body or the surgical removal of part of a margin of an eyelid containing the roots of the eyelashes.
- A ciliotomy is a surgical section of the ciliary nerves.
- A conjunctivoanstrostomy is an opening made from the inferior conjunctival cul-de-sac into the maxillary sinus for the treatment of epiphora.
- Conjuctivoplasty is plastic surgery of the conjunctiva.
- A conjunctivorhinostomy is a surgical correction of the total obstruction of a lacrimal canaliculus by which the conjunctiva is anastomosed with the nasal cavity to improve tear flow.
- A corectomedialysis, or coretomedialysis, is an excision of a small portion of the iris at its junction with the ciliary body to form an artificial pupil.
- A corectomy, or coretomy, is any surgical cutting operation on the iris at the pupil.
- A corelysis is a surgical detachment of adhesions of the iris to the capsule of the crystalline lens or cornea.
- A coremorphosis is the surgical formation of an artificial pupil.
- A coreplasty, or coreoplasty, is plastic surgery of the iris, usually for the formation of an artificial pupil.
- A coreoplasy, or laser pupillomydriasis, is any procedure that changes the size or shape of the pupil.
- A cyclectomy is an excision of portion of the ciliary body.
- A cyclotomy (surgery), or cyclicotomy, is a surgical incision of the ciliary body, usually for the relief of glaucoma.
- A cycloanemization is a surgical obliteration of the long ciliary arteries in the treatment of glaucoma.
- An iridectomesodialysis is the formation of an artificial pupil by detaching and excising a portion of the iris at its periphery.
- An iridodialysis, sometimes known as a coredialysis, is a localized separation or tearing away of the iris from its attachment to the ciliary body.
- An iridencleisis, or corencleisis, is a surgical procedure for glaucoma in which a portion of the iris is incised and incarcerated in a limbal incision. (Subdivided into basal iridencleisis and total iridencleisis.)
- An iridesis is a surgical procedure in which a portion of the iris is brought through and incarcerated in a corneal incision in order to reposition the pupil.
- An iridocorneosclerectomy is the surgical removal of a portion of the iris, the cornea, and the sclera.
- An iridocyclectomy is the surgical removal of the iris and the ciliary body.
- An iridocystectomy is the surgical removal of a portion of the iris to form an artificial pupil.
- An iridosclerectomy is the surgical removal of a portion of the sclera and a portion of the iris in the region of the limbus for the treatment of glaucoma.
- An iridosclerotomy is the surgical puncture of the sclera and the margin of the iris for the treatment of glaucoma.
- A rhinommectomy is the surgical removal of a portion of the internal canthus.
- A trepanotrabeculectomy is used in the treatment of chronic open- and chronic closed-angle glaucoma.
