= Robert Maloney =

Robert Maloney may refer to:

- Robert S. Maloney (1881–1934), U.S. Representative from Massachusetts
- Robert Maloney (doctor) (born 1958), American ophthalmologist and doctor on TV series Extreme Makeover
- Robert B. Maloney (born 1933), U.S. federal judge
- Robert Maloney (baseball) (1856–1908), baseball player

== See also ==
- Robert Malone (disambiguation)
