= Pannus =

Abnormal layer of tissue

Pannus is an abnormal layer of fibrovascular tissue or granulation tissue. Common sites for pannus formation include over the cornea, over a joint surface (as seen in rheumatoid arthritis), or on a prosthetic heart valve. Pannus may grow in a tumor-like fashion, as in joints where it may erode articular cartilage and bone.

In common usage, the term pannus is often used to refer to a panniculus (a hanging flap of tissue).

== Pannus in rheumatoid arthritis ==
The term "pannus" is derived from the Latin for "tablecloth". Chronic inflammation and exuberant proliferation of the synovium leads to formation of pannus and destruction of cartilage, bone, tendons, ligaments, and blood vessels. Pannus tissue is composed of aggressive macrophage- and fibroblast-like mesenchymal cells, macrophage-like cells and other inflammatory cells that release collagenolytic enzymes.

In people suffering from rheumatoid arthritis, pannus tissue eventually forms in the joint affected by the disease, causing bony erosion and cartilage loss via release of IL-1, prostaglandins, and substance P by macrophages.

== Pannus in ophthalmology ==
In ophthalmology, pannus refers to the growth of blood vessels into the peripheral cornea. In normal individuals, the cornea is avascular. Chronic local hypoxia (such as that occurring with overuse of contact lenses) or inflammation may lead to peripheral corneal vascularization, or pannus. Pannus may also develop in diseases of the corneal stem cells, such as aniridia. It is often resolved by peritomy.
