= Robert Maloney (doctor) =

American eye surgeon (born 1958)

Robert K. Maloney
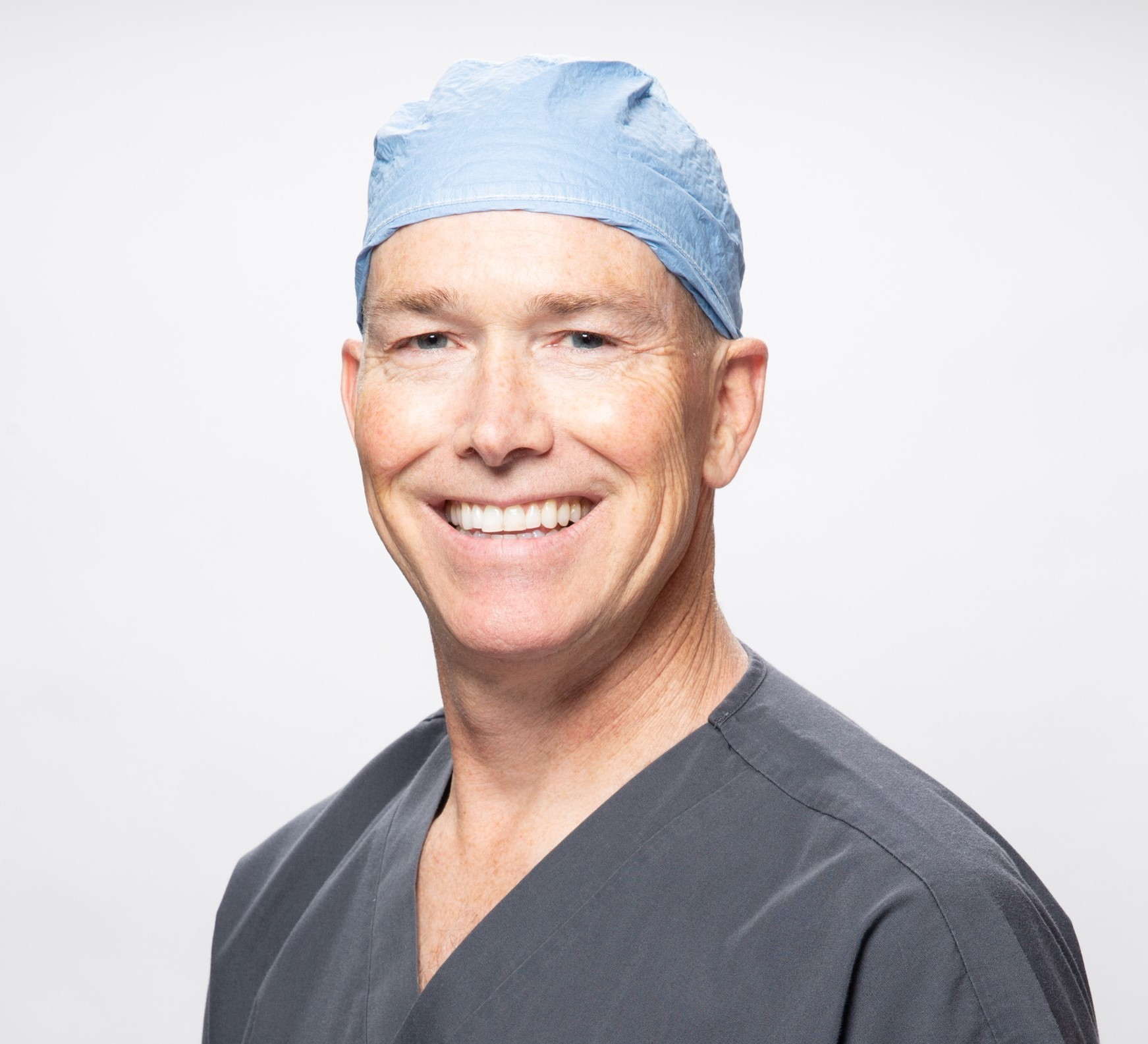
- Robert K. Maloney, MD, MA (Oxon)
- Born: May 1, 1958 (age 68); Los Angeles, California
- Education: Harvard College; University of Oxford; University of California, San Francisco
- Scientific career
- Fields: Ophthalmology Refractive surgery

Robert K. Maloney (born May 1, 1958) is an American ophthalmologist and medical innovator in the field of refractive surgery. A former Rhodes Scholar, he is a pioneer of laser in-situ keratomileusis (LASIK) eye surgery. Maloney was the first surgeon in western North America to perform LASIK surgery as part of the original FDA clinical trials. He published the first detailed descriptions of many of the complications of LASIK surgery, and he described how to successfully manage these complications. His body of research helped lead to the widespread acceptance of LASIK surgery as a safe alternative to spectacles and contact lenses.

== Early life and education ==
Born in Los Angeles, California, Maloney was influenced by his father, James Vincent Maloney Jr., a cardiothoracic surgeon, to pursue medicine. He graduated summa cum laude from Harvard College in three years with a bachelor's degree in mathematics, where he proved an original theorem in group representation theory.

Maloney earned a Master of Arts degree in philosophy, politics, and economics from the University of Oxford as a Rhodes Scholar. He earned his MD degree in 1985 from the University of California, San Francisco.

Maloney trained in ophthalmology at the Wilmer Institute of the Johns Hopkins Hospital, where his father had trained in surgery. He did a two-year fellowship in corneal surgery at Emory University under the direction of George O. Waring III, a pioneer in radial keratotomy surgery, finishing in 1991. Maloney was recruited back to Los Angeles to start a program in refractive surgery , at the Stein Eye Institute of the David Geffen School of Medicine at UCLA by its chair at the time, Bradley Straatsma, MD. In 1998 he left UCLA to found the Maloney Vision Institute, now known as the Maloney-Shamie-Hura Vision Institute, in Los Angeles, where he has practiced since.

== Career ==
Maloney attributes his decision to become an ophthalmologist to a famous cataract surgeon, Robert Sinskey, who restored vision to Maloney's grandmother who had gone blind from a failed surgery. Maloney chose to subspecialize in vision correction surgery because he hated his glasses and he hoped that someday he could figure out how to be rid of them. Maloney was introduced to LASIK on a visit to Crete by its inventor, Ioannis Pallikaris. He returned to the US and became a principal investigator in the first FDA trial of LASIK in 1991.

Contributions to refractive surgery

Maloney published extensively on LASIK and its complications. He was the first to publish a large case series on dry eye after LASIK. He published the first case series on epithelial ingrowth and described its pathophysiology. He named and described the syndromes of diffuse lamellar keratitis, central toxic keratopathy, and interface fluid syndrome. Maloney described the flap complications of LASIK, including a rotated free cap after LASIK. In each of these cases, he outlined how to avoid or manage the complication.

He also researched other methods for correcting vision. He was a principal investigator for twenty FDA clinical trials, including phakic IOLs, conductive keratoplasty, wavefront-guided LASIK, two corneal inlays, and the light-adjustable intraocular lens (IOL). He published the first multicenter trial using the excimer laser to treat corneal abnormalities. He showed that LASIK was safe in patients with well-controlled autoimmune diseases.

In addition to clinical research, Maloney played a central role in developing light-adjustable intraocular lenses, cofounding RxSight (NASDAQ: RXST), and serving as its chief medical officer and interim CEO.

Maloney has published 68 peer-reviewed scientific articles and delivered more than 400 lectures. He holds eleven patents, including two on the light-adjustable lens. According to Scopus, he has an h-index of 35 (accessed June 23, 2026). Maloney underwent successful LASIK surgery himself in 1996, achieving his life goal of being free of glasses.

== Television and books ==
Television

Maloney expanded public awareness of vision correction surgery through television appearances, most notably as the ophthalmologist on ABC's Extreme Makeover. The show was dubbed in seven languages and aired in 40 countries. He was also the LASIK surgeon on the Ten Years Younger reality TV series.

Books

Maloney is the lead author of two books for the general public: Cataract Surgery: A Patient's Guide to Treatment and See Better Now: LASIK, Lens Implants and Lens Exchange. Both books are in their third edition.

== Other interests ==
Maloney has served on the boards of various non-profit organizations, including Doheny Eye Institute, PIH Health system, Good Samaritan Hospital, Van Nuys Charities, the Association of American Rhodes Scholars and Harvard-Westlake School. He is an avid fly fisherman and skier. Maloney recently proofread a new textbook on general relativity for its author, Prof. Steven Balbus of Oxford University.

== Personal life ==
Maloney is married to Nicole Miller Maloney, a photographic artist best known for the 17-foot high OOMO cube at the Japanese American National Museum in downtown Los Angeles. They have three children.

== Honors and awards ==
Maloney has received numerous award recognizing his contributions to ophthalmology and refractive surgery:

- Dulaney Award, American-European Congress of Ophthalmic Surgeons, 2026, for contributions to ophthalmology.
- Visionary Award, American-European Congress of Ophthalmic Surgeons, 2021, for contributions to the field of cataract and refractive surgery.
- Ridley Lecturer, International Congress of German Ophthalmic Surgeons, 2016.
- Secretariat Award, American Academy of Ophthalmology, 2003, for outstanding and valuable contributions to the American Academy of Ophthalmology and to its scientific and educational programs
- Lans Distinguished Refractive Surgery Award, International Society of Refractive Surgery, 2001, for innovative contributions to the field of refractive surgery.
- Mericos Whittier Prize, Scripps Institute, 1997, awarded for outstanding achievements and contributions to the field of ophthalmology
