= Contoura Vision =

Refractive surgery technology

Contoura Vision is a topography guided laser technology used to correct refractive error and thereby decreasing or eliminating dependency on glasses or contact lenses. The technology reduces side effects linked with laser procedures like LASIK and SMILE. It was FDA approved in the US in 2016. The method provides measurement of 22,000 points as compared to 200 points provided by wave front-guided LASIK method. The imperfections in the cornea are recorded and then corrected using a laser.

== Effectiveness ==
=== Quality of vision ===
Contoura Vision has resulted in vision outcomes better than 6/6 (or 20/20, the standardized normal vision) in multiple patients who were a part of validation trials by the US FDA. Contoura Vision is the only technology where consistent success beyond 20/20 vision has been achieved in the majority of patients. More than 40% of the patients that were evaluated were able to read one line on the visual acuity chart more than a person with 20/20 vision, and 13.5% could read two additional lines.

Fewer visual disturbances such as glare, halos, ghost images, difficulty in night time driving and reading were also reported by many patients. Contoura vision exhibited superior quality of vision compared to LASIK and SMILE technology.

=== Comparison with other laser procedures ===
Contoura Vision was compared against Small Incision Lenticule Extraction (SMILE) to check the effectiveness by Kanellopoulos AJ and the results were published in Journal of Refractive Surgery in 2017. At 3 months, 86.4% of the Contoura Vision group and 68.2% of the SMILE group had UDVA (uncorrected distance visual acuity) of 20/20 (P < .002) and 59.1% and 31.8%, respectively, had UDVA of 20/16 (P < .002). Spherical equivalent refraction (±0.50 D) was 95.5% for the Contoura Vision group and 77.3% for the SMILE group (P < .002). Residual refraction cylinder (≤ 0.25 D) was 81.8% for the Contoura Vision group and 50% for the SMILE group (P < .001). Contrast sensitivity (6 cycles/degree) was 7.2 ± 1.01 in the Contoura Vision group and 6.20 ± 1.52 in the SMILE group. Objective Scatter Index measurements at 3 months were 1.35 in the Contoura Vision group and 1.42 in the SMILE group.

The author concluded that Contoura Vision was found to be superior compared to SMILE for all the visual performance parameters that were studied, irrespective the parameters were subjective and objective.
