= LRI =

LRI may refer to:

- Leicester Royal Infirmary
- Lift Reserve Indicator
- Limbal relaxing incisions
- Lincoln Red Imps F.C., a semi-professional football club from Gibraltar
- Line-replaceable item, a modular component of an airplane, ship or spacecraft
- London Research Institute, a biological research facility
- USCG Long Range Interceptor
- Lower respiratory (tract) infection
