= Small incision lenticule extraction =

Form of laser based refractive eye surgery

- Specialty: Ophthalmology

ReLEx Small incision lenticule extraction (SMILE), second generation of ReLEx Femtosecond lenticule extraction (FLEx), is a form of laser based refractive eye surgery developed by Carl Zeiss Meditec used to correct myopia, and cure astigmatism. Although similar to LASIK laser surgery, the intrastromal procedure uses a single femtosecond laser referenced to the corneal surface to cleave a thin lenticule from the corneal stroma for manual extraction.

== Process ==
The lenticule to be extracted is accurately cut to the correction prescription required by the patient using a photodisruption laser-tissue interaction. The posterior intrastromal plane is created first and the anterior plane second. To allow better separation, the two lenticule faces are cut by the laser head moving in a spiral fashion - conventionally outside in for the posterior face and respectively inside out for the anterior one. The minimum lenticule edge thickness is usually set at 15 μm, to avoid the risk of lenticule rupturing during detachment and subsequent extraction. The method of extraction was via a LASIK-type flap in ReLEx FLEx, but in SMILE a flapless technique makes a small tunnel incision in the corneal periphery, that does not (mostly) destroy Bowman's layer. One conspicuous difference between SMILE and LASIK is the size and shape of the corneal incision. In LASIK, the surgeon performs a 270-degree, 20 mm long incision, while in SMILE the so-called "side cap cut", which is the incision through which the surgeon extracts the lenticule, is usually about 4 mm long.

Currently in the US the procedure is only approved for nearsightedness, but is used for hypermetropia too in other countries.

After the femtosecond laser has separated the lenticule, a blunt spatula is inserted through the incision between the lenticule and the stroma and carefully rotated to ensure that the lenticule is completely detached prior to removal by forceps.

== History ==
The femtosecond lenticule extraction (FLE then FLEx) procedure was first introduced at the American Academy of Ophthalmology Annual Meeting in 2006 by Walter Sekundo and Marcus Blum, and was first published in 2008 by Walter Sekundo et al.The small incision lenticule extraction (SMILE) procedure was first published in 2011 by Walter Sekundo et al.

Various modifications of the procedure have since then been described which aim to reduce the duration of the procedure, reduce the risks of the lenticules being incorrectly cut or make the procedure easier to learn.

== Effectiveness ==
The procedure has been described as safe and predictable in treating myopia and astigmatism.

Because SMILE treatment is relatively new compared with other laser correction treatments, result studies are limited, but postoperative five year (SMILE) outcomes indicate that the results have been stable after 5 years of follow-up.

== Further research ==
As lenticule extraction techniques evolve, there is a possibility that extracted lenticules can be cryogenically preserved either for future donation, or re-implantation. Proof of concept has been carried out on primates where lenticules were extracted from monkeys and allogenically transplanted into other monkeys with positive results.

== Comparison with LASIK ==
Some theoretical advantages are that the technique is minimally invasive compared with LASIK and no collateral damage occurs to surrounding tissue due to the high speed of the femtosecond laser. There are limited studies on corneal wound healing and inflammatory response after this treatment has been carried out. There is a suggestion that the expression of fibronectin which is associated with wound healing is less in this method compared with femtosecond-LASIK.

In some cases post operative tear secretion and dry eye syndrome have been observed along with similar post operative complications seen in LASIK surgery.

Like PRK and LASEK, SMILE prevents the flap-related risks for example in contacts sports.
