= Ioannis Pallikaris =

Greek ophthalmologist (born 1947)

- Born: 18 November 1947 (age 78); Chania, Crete, Greece
- Education: Aristotle University of Thessaloniki; University of Zurich
- Scientific career
- Fields: Ophthalmology, refractive surgery, vitreoretinal surgery

Ioannis G. Pallikaris (Greek: Παλλήκαρης Ιωάννης; born 18 November 1947) is a Greek ophthalmologist who performed the first LASIK procedure on a human eye in 1990. He also developed Epi-LASIK.

== Early life and career ==
Pallikaris was born on 18 November 1947 in Chania, Crete. He earned his medical degree in 1972 from Aristotle University of Thessaloniki, Greece. He completed his residency and PhD thesis at the University of Zurich, Switzerland in 1981. He became a professor of ophthalmology in 1996.

Pallikaris became the director of the Department of Ophthalmology at the University of Crete, where he began focusing again on refractive surgery. Within the University of Crete, he founded the Institute of Vision and Optics (IVO). Palikaris served as the rector of the University of Crete between 2003 and 2011. He later trained as a vitreo-retinal surgeon.

Pallikaris serves as the Medical Advisory Board Chair for Presbia, an ophthalmic device company, where he is responsible for overseeing the post-market surveillance trials of the Flexivue Microlens, a corneal inlay treatment for presbyopia, the age-related loss of near vision. The Flexivue Microlens is a 3 mm diameter lens inserted into a corneal pocket created by a femtosecond laser in the non-dominant eye of a presbyopic patient. The lens preserves the patient's distance vision, while providing equivalent near vision correction, allowing the patient to focus on near objects without the aid of reading glasses.

Pallikaris also conducts training sessions for surgeons at the Vardinoyannion Eye Institute, which he founded.

His research interests span all fields of ophthalmology, including refractive surgery, visual optics, medical lasers, biopolymers, retinal surgery and image analysis, as well as the design and development of microsurgical instrumentation.

== Impact and legacy ==
Pallikaris' most significant impact has been in refractive surgery, with his most notable contribution being the development of LASIK, which he first performed on a human eye in 1990. He also developed Epi-LASIK. Pallikaris has published more than 200 articles in international journals and holds over 20 patents related to optics and ophthalmology.

== Personal life ==
Pallikaris is married to Varvara Terzaki Pallikaris, a social reformer in Crete. Together, they founded the "University of Mountains", a not-for-profit organization providing eye care to people in villages and mountainous regions who lack access to healthcare. They have three children, two sons and one daughter.

== Awards ==
Pallikaris has received several awards for his work, including an American Academy of Ophthalmology (AAO) Lifetime Achievement Award and the European Society of Cataract Refractive Surgery (ESCRS) Binkhorst Medal.
