= Evisceration (ophthalmology) =

Removal of the eye's contents

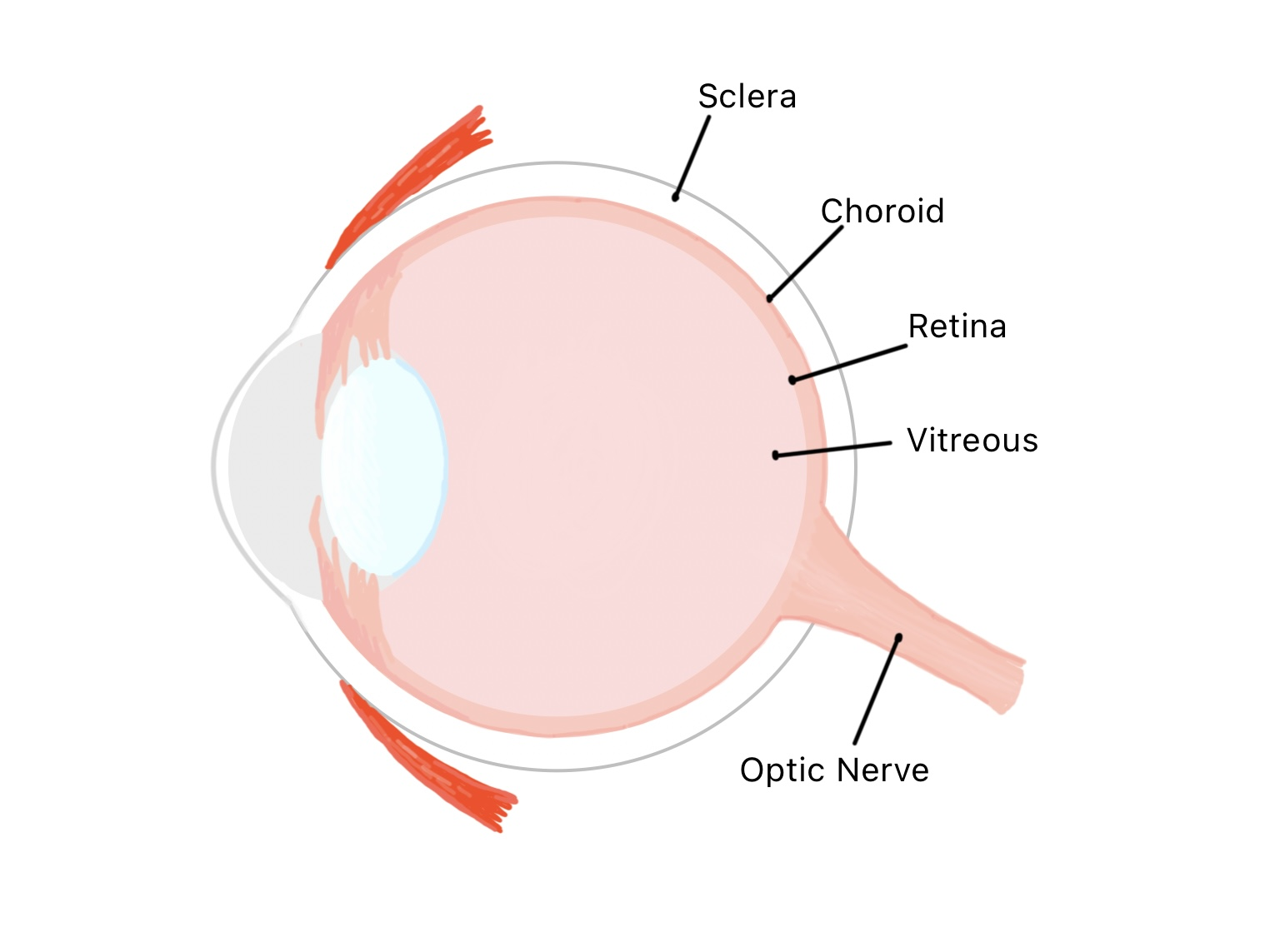

Ocular evisceration is the removal of the eye's contents, leaving the scleral shell and extraocular muscles intact. The procedure is usually performed to reduce pain, improve cosmetic appearance in a blind eye, treat cases of endophthalmitis unresponsive to antibiotics, or in the case of ocular trauma. An ocular prosthetic can be later fitted over the eviscerated eye in order to improve cosmetic appearance.

== Background ==
Evisceration is a surgical procedure that involves the removal the eye's contents while leaving the white part of the eye (the scleral shell) and extraocular muscles in place. Evisceration differs from enucleation, as enucleation involves the removal of the scleral shell as well. Evisceration was first described by Bear in 1817 as an experimental treatment for expulsive hemorrhage, and with the advent of general anesthesia in the 1840s, the procedure was refined and ocular implants were developed.

== Indications ==
Evisceration involves disrupting the integrity of the globe, and therefore is not typically used in patients with intraocular cancers as it may risk spreading cancerous cells to other parts of the body. The most common indications for evisceration include a blind painful eye, trauma, or infection.

== Pre-operative evaluation ==
Prior to surgery, the eye must be carefully examined by an ophthalmologist to check for ocular cancer or other conditions that may complicate the procedure. If the back of the eye cannot be visualized, then a CT scan should be performed. If neither clinical evaluation nor imaging can rule out cancer, then enucleation may be considered as an alternative to prevent the possibility of malignant spread.

== Surgical technique ==
The surgery is performed in the operating room typically under general anesthesia, however it can also be conducted using local anesthesia with sedation. Procedure time is typically one to two hours.

Prior to surgery, the correct eye must be marked and verified. The patient is anesthetized, the field is sterilized, then draped in a sterile manner. An eyelid speculum is placed to keep the eyelids open during the surgery. The procedure begins with a 360° periotomy followed by a stab incision in the sclera. The incision is then expanded around the limbus circumferentially and the orbital contents are removed using an evisceration spoon. The optic disc is then cauterized and the scleral shell is cleaned. A spherical implant is then inserted into the scleral shell and the shell is sutured together, encasing the implant. The intraocular contents may be sent for pathological examination once removed.

== Post-operation ==
After the surgery, strenuous physical activity should be avoided until cleared by a physician. Contaminated bodies of water, such as pools, lakes, and the ocean should be avoided. The surgeon will typically provide instructions on bathing, as tap water may also be contaminated.

Post-operative pain may be controlled with either prescription medications or over the counter pain relievers. Some patients may be given steroids or antibiotics depending on the indication for the surgery and surgeon preference.

== Prostheses ==
Once the operating surgeon determines that the orbit has healed adequately, an ocularist can custom fit a prosthetic eye to improve cosmetic appearance. This will typically occur 6-8 weeks post-op. With proper care, prosthetic eyes can last decades.

== Possible complications ==
As with any surgery, evisceration may be complicated by bleeding, swelling, infection, and scarring. Although these complications are rare, a doctor should be consulted regarding any pre-existing conditions or current medications that may increase the chance of surgical complications. There are also risks with general anesthesia, especially in patients with certain pre-existing health conditions. In addition, patients may experience eyelid droopiness and complications related to the ocular implant. Eyelid droopiness may require additional surgery for correction.

== See also ==
- Enucleation of the eye
- Eye surgery
- Oculoplastics
