= Refractive surgery =

Surgery to treat common vision disorders

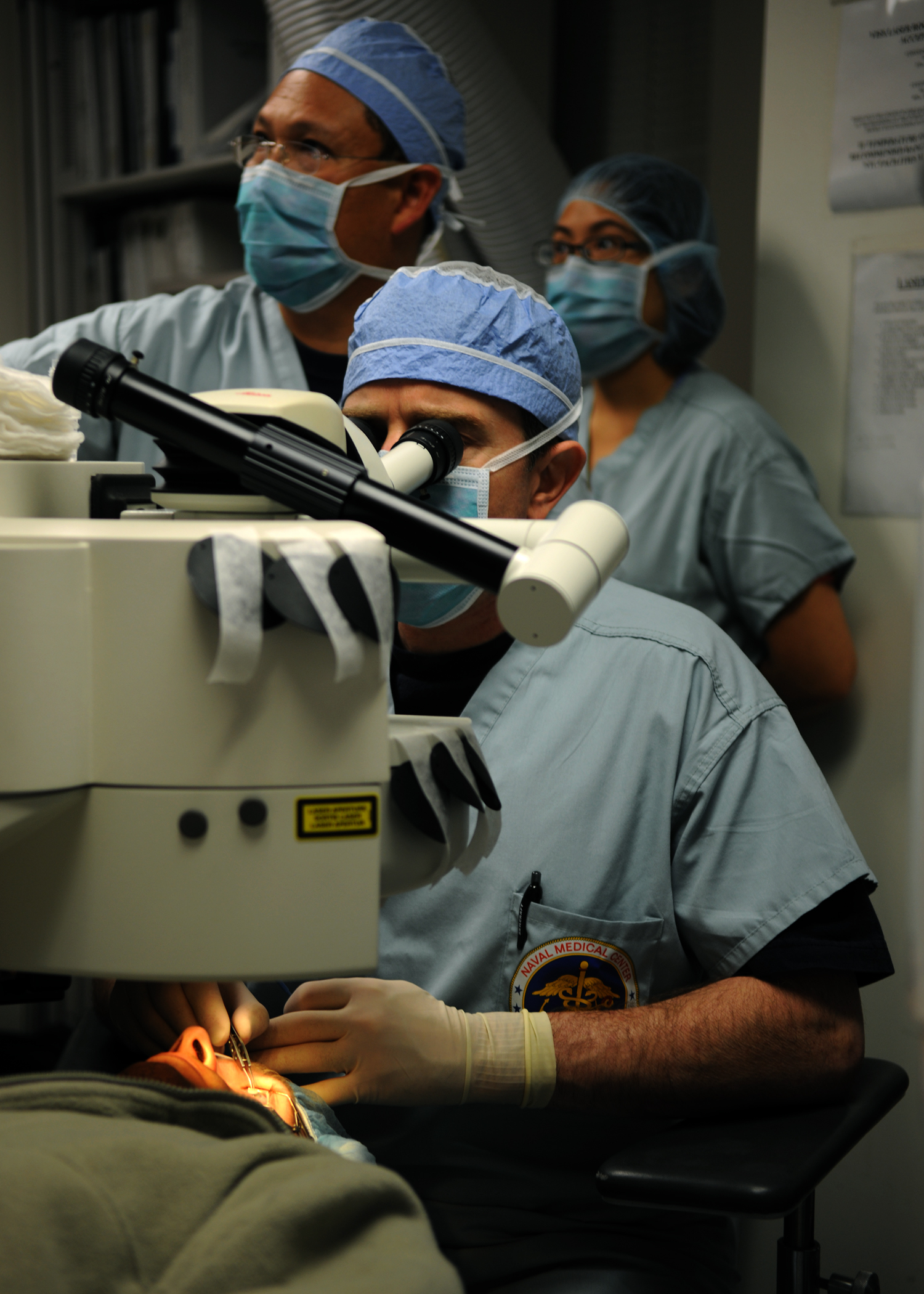
- Surgeon performing a photorefractive keratectomy (PRK)
- Specialty: Ophthalmology, optometry
- Types: Myopia, hyperopia, astigmatism, presbyopia

Refractive surgery is an optional eye surgery used to improve the refractive state of the eye and thereby decrease or eliminate dependency on glasses or contact lenses. This can include various methods of surgical remodeling of the cornea (keratomileusis), lens implantation or lens replacement. The most common methods today use excimer lasers to reshape the curvature of the cornea. Refractive eye surgeries are used to treat common vision disorders such as myopia, hyperopia, presbyopia and astigmatism.

== History ==
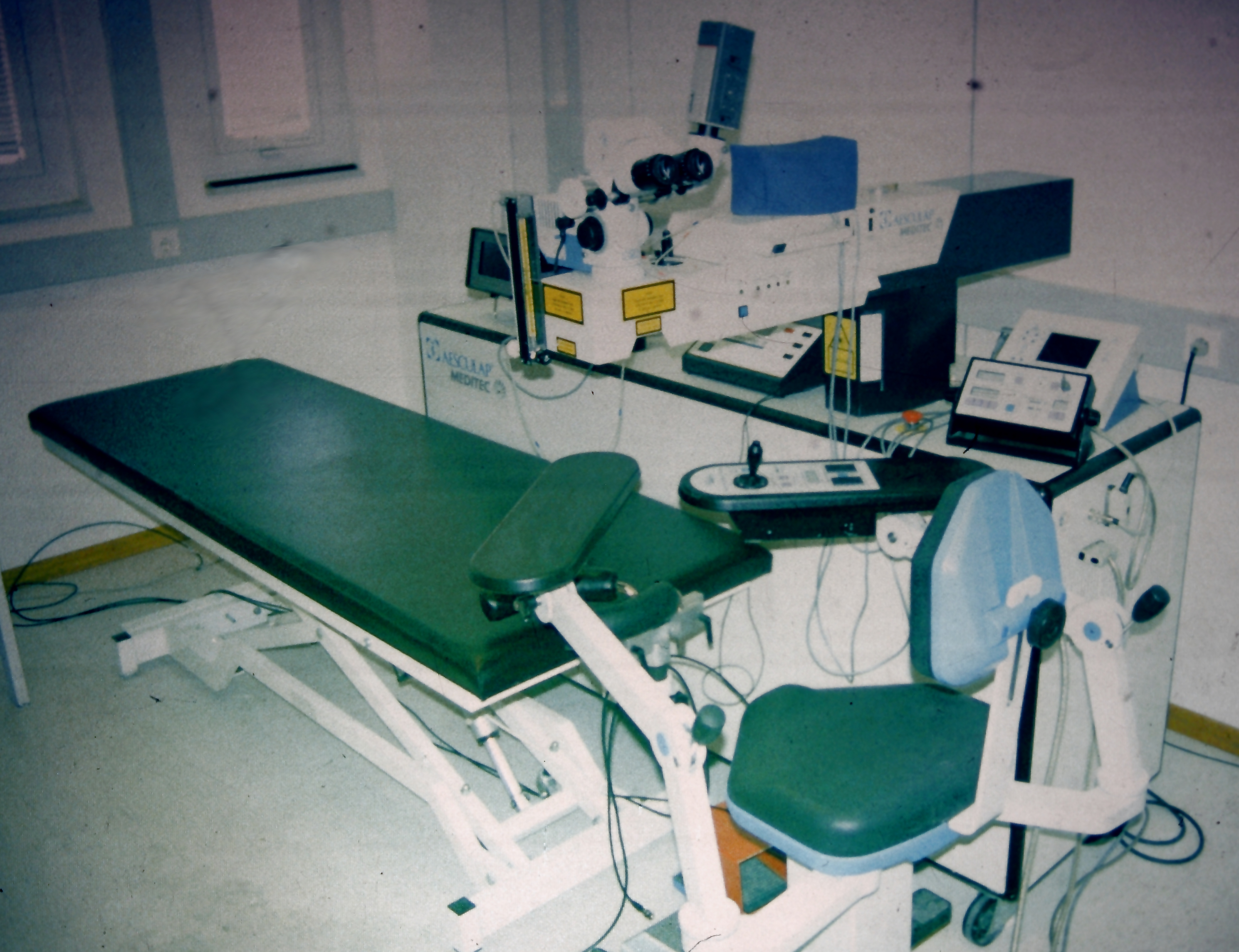
The excimer laser that was used for the first LASIK surgeries by Ioannis Pallikaris

Refractive surgery is an optional eye surgery. It is used to improve the refractive state of the eye to treat vision disorders. Refractive surgery is intended to decrease or eliminate dependency on glasses or contact lenses. The first theoretical work on the potential of refractive surgery was published in 1885 by Hjalmar August Schiøtz, an ophthalmologist from Norway. In 1930, the Japanese ophthalmologist Tsutomu Sato made the first attempts at performing this kind of surgery, hoping to correct the vision of military pilots. His approach was to make radial cuts in the cornea, correcting effects by up to 6 diopters. The procedure unfortunately produced a high rate of corneal degeneration, however, and was soon rejected by the medical community.

The first proficient refractive surgery technique was developed in the Barraquer ophthalmologic clinic (Bogotá, Colombia), in 1963, by Jose Barraquer. His technique, called keratomileusis—meaning corneal reshaping (from Greek κέρας (kéras: horn) and σμίλευσις (smileusis: carving)—enabled the correction, not only of myopia, but also of hyperopia. It involves removing a corneal layer, freezing it so that it could be manually sculpted into the required shape, and finally reimplanting the reshaped layer into the eye. In 1980, Swinger performed first keratomileusis surgery in US. In 1985, Krumeich and Swinger introduced non-freeze keratomileusis technique, it remained a relatively imprecise technique.

In 1974, a refractive procedure called radial keratotomy (RK) was developed in the USSR by Svyatoslav Fyodorov and later introduced to the United States. RK involves making a number of cuts in the cornea to change its shape and correct refractive errors. The incisions are made with a diamond knife. Following the introduction of RK, doctors routinely corrected nearsightedness, farsightedness, and astigmatism using various applications of incisions on the cornea.

Meanwhile, experiments in 1970 using a xenon dimer and in 1975 using noble gas halides resulted in the invention of a type of laser called an excimer laser. While excimer lasers were initially used for industrial purposes, in 1980, Rangaswamy Srinivasan, a scientist of IBM who was using an excimer laser to make microscopic circuits in microchips for informatics equipment, discovered that the excimer could also be used to cut organic tissues with high accuracy without significant thermal damage. The discovery of an effective biological cutting laser, along with the development of computers to control it, enabled the development of new refractive surgery techniques.

In 1983, Stephen Trokel, a scientist at Columbia University, in collaboration with Theo Seiler and Srinivasan, performed the first Photorefractive Keratectomy (PRK), or keratomileusis in situ (without separation of corneal layer) in Germany. The first patent for this approach, which later became known as LASIK surgery, was granted by the US Patent Office to Gholam Ali. Peyman, MD on June 20, 1989. It involves cutting a flap in the cornea and pulling it back to expose the corneal bed, then using an excimer laser to ablate the exposed surface to the desired shape, and then replacing the flap. The name LASIK was coined in 1991 by the University of Crete and the Vardinoyannion Eye.

The patents related to so-called broad-beam LASIK and PRK technologies were granted to US companies including Visx and Summit during 1990–1995 based on the fundamental US patent issued to IBM (1983) which claimed the use of UV laser for the ablation of organic tissues.

In 1991, J.T. Lin, Ph.D. (a Chinese Physicist) was granted a US patent for a new technology using a flying-spot for customized LASIK currently used worldwide. The first US patent using an eye-tracking device to prevent decentration in LASIK procedures was granted to another Chinese Physicist, Dr. S. Lai in 1993.

== Techniques ==
Refractive surgery can include various methods of surgical remodeling of the cornea (keratomileusis), lens implantation or lens replacement. The most common methods today use excimer lasers to reshape the curvature of the cornea.

=== Flap procedures ===
Excimer laser ablation is done under a partial-thickness lamellar corneal flap.

- Automated lamellar keratoplasty (ALK): The surgeon uses an instrument called a microkeratome to cut a thin flap of the corneal tissue. The flap is lifted like a hinged door, targeted tissue is removed from the corneal stroma, again with the microkeratome, and then the flap is replaced.
- Laser-assisted in situ keratomileusis (LASIK): The surgeon uses either a microkeratome or a femtosecond laser to cut a flap of the corneal tissue (usually with a thickness of 100–180 micrometres). The flap is lifted like a hinged door, but in contrast to ALK, the targeted tissue is removed from the corneal stroma with an excimer laser. The flap is subsequently replaced. When the flap is created using an IntraLase brand femtosecond laser, the method is called IntraLASIK; other femtosecond lasers such as the Ziemer create a flap similarly. Femtosecond lasers have numerous advantages over mechanical microkeratome based procedure. Microkeratome related flap complications like incomplete flaps, buttonholes or epithelial erosion are largely eliminated utilising the femtosecond laser procedure. Absence of microscopic metal fragments from the blade will reduce the risk of lamellar keratitis also.
  - Customized aspheric treatment zone (CATz) is a topography-guided LASIK treatment developed by NIDEK Co. Ltd which ablates the cornea based on patient-specific geometry to address certain disadvantages in conventional wavefront spherocylindrical ablation. The treatment is effective for myopia with astigmatism or otherwise irregular corneas, and reduces symptoms such as glare, halos, and night driving difficulty.
- Keratorefractive lenticule extraction (KLEx) encompasses all proprietary terms for corneal lenticule extraction surgeries for refractive error correction.
- KLEx "FLEx" (femtosecond lenticule extraction): A femtosecond laser cuts a disc-shaped piece of corneal tissue called a "lenticule" within the corneal stroma. Subsequently, a LASIK-like flap is cut which can be lifted to access the lenticule. This is removed through manual dissection using a blunt spatula and forceps.
- KLEx "SMILE" (small incision lenticule extraction): A newer technique without a flap, a femtosecond laser cuts a lenticule within the corneal stroma. The same laser is used to cut a small incision along the periphery of the lenticule about 1/5th the size of a standard LASIK flap incision. The surgeon then uses a specially designed instrument to separate and remove the lenticule through the incision, leaving the anterior lamellae of the cornea intact. No excimer laser is used in the "ReLEx-procedures". "SMILE" often refers to the first commercially available KLEX procedure however there remain many derivatives including SMILE Pro, SILK, CLEAR and SmartSIGHT. These terms reflect the principal companies and differ by the laser used for the procedure. Although each laser is a femtosecond laser, there remain minor differences between laser properties.

=== Surface procedures ===
The excimer laser is used to ablate the most anterior portion of the corneal stroma. These procedures do not require a partial thickness cut into the stroma. Surface ablation methods differ only in the way the epithelial layer is handled.

- Photorefractive keratectomy (PRK) is an outpatient procedure generally performed with local anesthetic eye drops (as with LASIK/LASEK). It is a type of refractive surgery which reshapes the cornea by removing microscopic amounts of tissue from the corneal stroma, using a computer-controlled beam of light (excimer laser). The difference from LASIK is that the top layer of the epithelium is removed (and a bandage contact lens is used), so no flap is created. Recovery time is longer with PRK than with LASIK, though the outcome (after three months) is about the same (very good). More recently, customized ablation has been performed with LASIK, LASEK, and PRK.
- Transepithelial photorefractive keratectomy (TransPRK) is a laser-assisted eye surgery to correct refraction errors of human eye corneas. It uses an excimer laser to ablate the outer layer of the cornea, the epithelium, as well as its connective tissue, the stroma, to correct the eye's optical power.
- Laser-assisted sub-epithelium keratomileusis (LASEK) is also a procedure that changes the shape of the cornea using an excimer laser to ablate the tissue from the corneal stroma, under the corneal epithelium, which is kept mostly intact to act as a natural bandage. The surgeon uses an alcohol solution to loosen then lift a thin layer of the epithelium (usually with a thickness of 50 micrometres) with a trephine blade. During the weeks following LASEK, the epithelium heals, leaving no permanent flap in the cornea. This healing process can involve discomfort comparable to that with PRK.
- EPI-LASIK is a new technique similar to LASEK that uses an epi-keratome (rather than a trephine blade and alcohol), to remove the top layer of the epithelium (usually with thickness of 50 micrometres), which is subsequently replaced. For some people it can provide better results than regular LASEK in that it avoids the possibility of negative effects from the alcohol, and recovery may involve less discomfort.
- Customized transepithelial no-touch (C-TEN) is an innovative strategy for corneal surgery that avoids any corneal manipulation via a complete laser-assisted trans-epithelial approach. Since C-TEN is planned on the morphology of each individual eye, it can treat a large variety of corneal pathologies from refractive to therapeutic. C-TEN is sometimes referred to as advanced surface ablation (ASA).

=== Corneal incision procedures ===
- Radial keratotomy (RK), developed by Russian ophthalmologist Svyatoslav Fyodorov in 1974, uses spoke-shaped incisions, always made with a diamond knife, to alter the shape of the cornea and reduce myopia or astigmatism; this technique is, in medium to high diopters, usually replaced by other refractive methods.
- Arcuate keratotomy (AK), also known as astigmatic keratotomy, uses curvilinear incisions at the periphery of the cornea to correct high levels of non-pathological astigmatism, up to 13 diopters. AK is often used for the correction of high post-keratoplasty astigmatism or post-cataract surgery astigmatism.
- Limbal relaxing incisions (LRI) are incisions near the outer edge of the iris, used to correct minor astigmatism (typically less than 2 diopters). This is often performed in conjunction with the implantation of intraocular lenses.

=== Refractive lens exchange ===
Clear lens extraction or refractive lens exchange is effectively the same procedure as cataract surgery used to replace a natural lens with high refractive error when other methods are not effective. It can be done in patients with severe refractive error and/or presbyopia who wish to avoid spectacles. In addition to the common complications of cataract surgery, clear lens extraction may also cause premature posterior vitreous detachment and retinal detachment. In some people with very high myopia, the eye may be left aphakic, without intraocular lens implantation. A related procedure is the implantation of phakic intraocular lenses in series with the natural lens to correct vision in cases of high refractive errors.

=== Other procedures ===
- Radial keratocoagulation, also known as radial thermokeratoplasty, was invented in 1985 by Svyatoslav Fyodorov and is used to correct hyperopia by putting a ring of 8 or 16 small burns surrounding the pupil, and steepen the cornea with a ring of collagen constriction. It can also be used to treat selected types of astigmatism. It is now generally replaced by laser thermal keratoplasty/laser thermokeratoplasty.
- Laser thermal keratoplasty (LTK) is a non-touch thermal keratoplasty performed with a Holmium laser, while conductive keratoplasty (CK) is thermal keratoplasty performed with a high-frequency electric probe. Thermal keratoplasty can also be used to improve presbyopia or reading vision after age 40.
- Intrastromal corneal ring segments (Intacs) are approved by FDA for treatment of low degrees of myopia.
- Phakic intraocular lens (PIOL) implantation inside the eye can also be used to change refractive errors. The newest type of intervention is a type of PIOL called the implantable collamer lens (ICL), which uses a biocompatible flexible lens which can be inserted in the eye via a 3 mm incision. The ICL is used to correct myopia ranging from −0.5 to −18 diopters, and +0.5 cylinder power to +6.0 for the Toric ICL models.
- Refractive surgery can be broadly divided into corneal surgery, scleral surgery, and lens related surgery (including phakic IOL implantation, clear lens extraction, photophacoreduction and photophacomodulation for correction of presbyopia).
- For presbyopia correction, a corneal inlay consisting of a porous black ring surrounding a small clear aperture was originally developed by D. Miller, H. Grey PhD and a group at Acufocus. The inlay is placed under a LASIK flap or in a stromal pocket.

Using mid-IR and UV lasers for the treatment of presbyopia by scleral tissue ablation was first proposed and patented by J.T. Lin, Ph.D. in US patents #6,258,082 (in 2001) and #6,824,540 (in 2004).

== Expectations ==
Refractive eye surgeries are used to treat common vision disorders such as myopia, hyperopia, presbyopia and astigmatism.

Research conducted by the Magill Research Center for Vision Correction, Medical University of South Carolina, showed that the overall patient satisfaction rate after primary LASIK surgery was 95.4%. They further differentiated between myopic LASIK (95.3%) and hyperopic LASIK (96.3%). They concluded that the vast majority (95.4%) of patients were satisfied with their outcome after LASIK surgery.

Ophthalmologists use various approaches to analyze the results of refractive surgery, and alter their techniques to provide better results in the future. Some of these approaches are programmed into the devices ophthalmologists use to measure the refraction of the eye and the shape of the cornea, such as corneal topography.

== Risks ==
While refractive surgery is becoming more affordable and safe, it may not be recommended for everybody. People with certain eye diseases involving the cornea or retina, pregnant women, and patients who have medical conditions such as glaucoma, diabetes, uncontrolled vascular disease, or autoimmune disease are not good candidates for refractive surgery. Keratoconus, a progressive thinning of the cornea, is a common corneal disorder. Keratoconus occurring after refractive surgery is called Corneal Ectasia. It is believed that additional thinning of the cornea via refractive surgery may contribute to advancement of the disease that may lead to the need for a corneal transplant. Therefore, keratoconus is a contraindication to refractive surgery. Corneal topography and pachymetry are used to screen for abnormal corneas. Furthermore, some people's eye shape may not permit effective refractive surgery without removing excessive amounts of corneal tissue. Those considering laser eye surgery should have a full eye examination.

Although the risk of complications is decreasing compared to the early days of refractive surgery, there is still a small chance for serious problems. These include vision problems such as ghosting, halos, starbursts, double-vision, and dry-eye syndrome. With procedures that create a permanent flap in the cornea (such as LASIK), there is also the possibility of accidental traumatic flap displacement years after the surgery, with potentially disastrous results if not given prompt medical attention.

For patients with strabismus, risks of complications such as diplopia and/or increased strabismus angle need to be evaluated carefully. In case both refractive surgery and strabismus surgery are to be performed, it is recommended that the refractive surgery be done first.

== Children ==
Pediatric refractive surgery involves other risks than refractive surgery on adults, yet it may be indicated especially for children whose cognitive or visual development is failing due to refractive error, in particular in cases of bilateral high refractive error, anisometropia, anisometric amblyopia or accommodative esotropia.

Interventions on young children may require general anaesthesia in order to avoid risks due to involuntary movement, and children have a higher risk of rubbing or manipulating their eyes post-surgically. Changes to refractive error occurring during normal age development need to be accounted for, and children have a higher risk of developing postoperative corneal haze. This risk is particularly relevant with relation to myopic children.

One study evaluated the outcome of LASEK interventions on 53 children aged 10 months to 16 years who had anisometropic amblyopia. The choice of LASEK was made as it was felt it would give fewer complications than LASIK and less post-operative pain than PRK. In the intervention, which was performed under general anaesthesia, the refractive error in the weaker eye was corrected to balance the refractive error of the other eye. Strabismus surgery was performed later if required. After one year, over 60% had improved in best corrected visual acuity (BCVA) in the weaker eye. Notably, over 80% showed stereopsis (depth perception) post-operatively whereas less than 40% had shown stereopsis before.

In addition to corneal refractive procedures (LASIK, PRK and LASEK), intraocular refractive procedures (phakic intraocular lenses, refractive lens exchange and clear lens extraction) are also performed on children.

== See also ==
- Orthokeratology – contact lenses worn only at night to reshape the eye.
