= Conductive keratoplasty =

Refractive surgery of the cornea using radio frequency

- Specialty: Ophthalmology

Conductive keratoplasty (CK) is a type of refractive surgery that uses radio waves to adjust the contour of the cornea by shrinking the corneal collagen around it. It is used to treat mild to moderate hyperopia. It is a non-invasive alternative to other types of eye surgery. It uses the same principles of Laser thermal keratoplasty (LTK) and radial keratocoagulation, although the former uses holmium laser and the latter a 700°C needle to correct hyperopia.
