= Robert Malone =

Bob, Rob or Robert Malone may refer to:

- Robert W. Malone (born 1959), American physician and biochemist
- Bob Malone (born 1965), American keyboardist, singer and songwriter
- Robert Malone (American football) (born 1988), punter
