= Theo Seiler =

German ophthalmologist and physicist

Theo Seiler (born February 12, 1949, in Ravensburg, Germany) is a German ophthalmologist and physicist. He is considered one of the pioneers of refractive surgery.

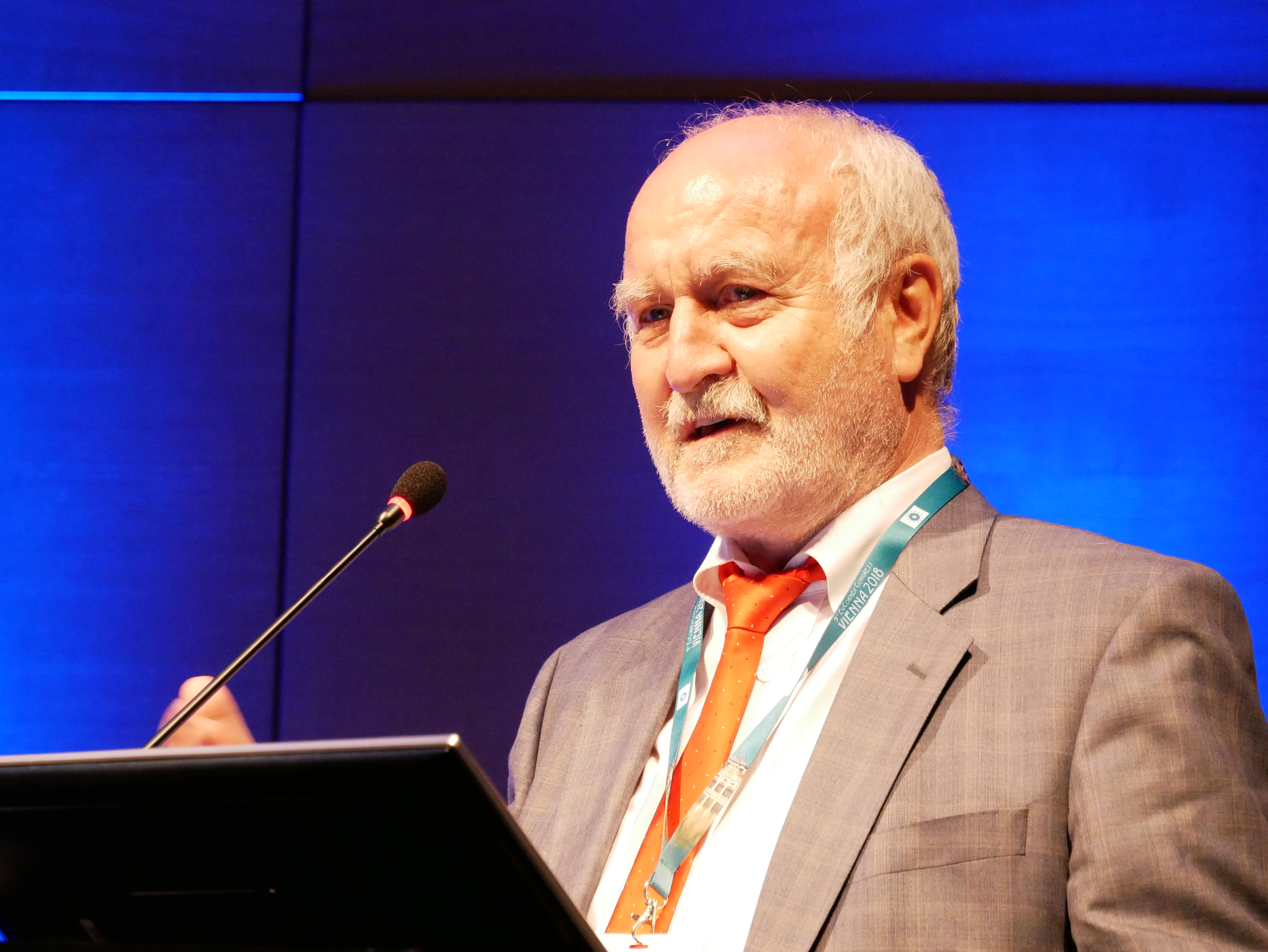
Theo Seiler

== Biography ==
Seiler graduated from gymnasium in 1968 and enrolled the same year at the University of Heidelberg where he studied mathematics and physics. He received his prediploma in physics in 1970 and eventually continued his studies at the Freie Universität of Berlin where he graduated in 1972 with a degree in physics. He also began with his medical studies in the same year.

In 1975 Seiler he commenced his doctorate studies in physics, resulting in the dissertation "Modulated dynamic nuclear polarization of the nuclei of smaller gyromagnetic ratios" at the Free University of Berlin and started his teaching profession for higher education (mathematics and physics) in the following year. At the same time he continued his medical studies and passed the medical state examination in 1981 and was granted a license to practice medicine in 1982.

He worked as medical assistant in 1981 at the Eye Clinic of the Free University of Berlin and was promoted to be lecturer in 1982. His doctorate followed in 1984 with a thesis on "Linearity of tonometry" for which he received his title as Dr. med. summa cum laude. In 1986 he became a specialist registrar in ophthalmology and also became senior physician at the University Eye Clinic of the Free University of Berlin, eventually also being appointed in 1989 as Deputy Head. He habilitated at the Free University of Berlin in 1987 with his scientific paper "Refractive corneal surgery" and was appointed as professor in ophthalmology in 1989.

On October 1, 1993, Seiler was appointed professor at the Department of Ophthalmology and Chairman of the Department of Ophthalmology at the Carl Gustav Carus University Hospital of the University of Technology of Dresden. He kept this position until January 1, 2000, when he was appointed as Chairman of the Department of Ophthalmology of the University of Zürich.

In October 2002, he founded the Institute for Refractive and Ophthalmic Surgery (IROC) in Zurich. His work and research interests include corneal surgery, especially refractive corneal surgery, surgery of the anterior segment and physiological Optics.

Seiler is a member of the German Ophthalmological Society (DOG), the American Academy of Ophthalmology (AAO), the Swiss Ophthalmological Society (SOG), the American Society of Refractive and Cataract Surgery (ASCRS), the European Cornea Society (EuCornea), the International Society of Refractive Surgery (ISRS) and served as boardmember for the DOG, ISRS and EuCornea.

== Achievements and new developments ==
- 1983 Development of the first clinical dye laser
- 1984 Development of the first surface coil for MRI of the orbit
- 1985 World's first PTK on human eyes
- 1987 World's first PRK on human Eyes
- 1988 World's first Holimum YAG laser PRK thermokeratoplasty
- 1989 First clinical studies on PRK
- 1995 Invention of Corneal Crosslinking (CXL)
- 1998 First clinical applications of corneal Crosslinking
- 1999 World's first wavefront-guided laser treatment on the human eye
- 2002 First topography-guided treatment with the WaveLight laser
- 2010 First combination of LASIK and rapid crosslinking

== Awards ==
- 1987 Axelfeld Award (DOG)
- 1994 Khing Khaled-Award (SAOS)
- 1994 Binkhorst Award (AAO)
- 1995 Barraquer Award (AAO)
- 1996 Graefe Award (DOG)
- 1997 Honour Award (AAO)
- 2002 President´s Award (ISRS/AAO)
- 2004 Lifetime Achievement Award (AAO)
- 2008 Innovators lecture (ASCRS)
- 2009 Ophthalmologe des Jahres 2009
- 2009 Senior Achievement Award (AAO)
- 2010 Science Award (DGII)
- 2012 International Leadership in Ophthalmology (HEF)
- 2012 Fjodorov Award (HSIOIRS)
- 2012 Hawaiian Eye Foundation's International Award for Excellence
- 2013 Franceschetti Award
- 2013 Jørn Boberg-Ans Memorial Award (DOS)
- 2013 Franceschetti Award
- 2013 Danish Ophthalmological Society
- 2014 DOC-Medaille in Gold
- 2014 ASCRS Ophthalmology Hall of Fame
- 2014 Honorary membership of the BRASCRS
