= Limbal relaxing incisions =

Refractive surgery to correct astigmatism

- Specialty: Ophthalmology

Limbal relaxing incisions (LRI) are a refractive surgical procedure to correct minor astigmatism in the eye. Incisions part way through the cornea are made at one side or at opposite edges of the cornea, following the curve of the iris, causing a slight flattening of the cornea in that area. Because the incisions are outside of the field of view, they do not cause glare and other visual effects that result from other corneal surgeries like radial keratotomy.

LRI have become the most common technique to correct astigmatism as part of cataract surgery. They are simpler and less expensive than laser surgery such as LASIK or photorefractive keratectomy and avoid the precise placement requirements of toric IOLs. Good results do not require the location and length of the incisions to be highly precise, and the incisions can easily be extended later if the original procedure did not correct all of the astigmatism.

LRIs have a coupling ratio of close to 1:1, meaning that the amount of flattening induced in the incised meridian as balanced by steepening 90° away, so negligible change in sphero-equivalent occurs, and no adjustment of IOL power is required.

Recovery is generally quick and painless, although the patient may experience discomfort.
