= Peritomy =

Incision made in the limbus in eye surgery

A peritomy is a procedure carried out during eye surgery, where an incision is made around the limbus, usually to expose the sclera and/or extraocular muscles for a variety of surgical procedures.
