= Laser thermal keratoplasty =

Type of corneal refactive surgery

Laser thermal keratoplasty (LTK)
- Specialty: Ophthalmology

Laser thermal keratoplasty is a non-contact laser refractive surgery to the cornea of the eye.

== Procedure ==
The procedure employs a holmium laser to place a ring of concentric laser burns on the cornea between 6 mm and 7 mm in diameter. These burns cause a ring of constriction on the peripheral cornea causing the cornea to steepen making the eye focus better at near. This procedure may regress somewhat over time. It is similar to the conductive keratoplasty (CK) procedure where a micro-needle high frequency probe is used to make a ring of corneal burns in a similar fashion.

== Patents ==
This is an FDA procedure patented by Sunrise Technologies and currently owned by Priavision.
