= Automated lamellar keratoplasty =

Non-laser lamellar refractive procedure

- Other names: ALK
- Specialty: Ophthalmology

Automated lamellar keratoplasty (ALK), also known as keratomileusis in situ, is a non-laser lamellar refractive procedure used to correct high degree refractive errors. This procedure can correct large amounts of myopia and hyperopia. However, the resultant change is not as predictable as with other procedures.

== Procedure ==
ALK uses a device called a microkeratome to separate a thin layer of the cornea and create a flap.The eye is anesthetized and a ring is fixed to it in order to keep it properly positioned and flat. The microkeratome then makes a small incomplete flap across the cornea by cutting across it. While still attached at one side, the corneal flap is folded back to reveal a sub layer of cornea.

At this point, the microkeratome is precisely readjusted to match the calculated cut depth for the patient's vision correction. The calculation is based on the patient's glasses and contact lens prescriptions. The surgeon then passes the microkeratome completely over the eye making the power cut. After the power cut, the corneal flap is laid back over the eye where it reattaches.

ALK is a technique used to correct very high levels of myopia and is generally used from -5.00 to -18.00 diopters of nearsightedness.

== Advantages and disadvantages ==
Healing time from ALK is very rapid, usually in about 24 hours or so. Results are immediately realized, though it may take several months for the vision correction to finally stabilize.

On the down side, the results of ALK are not as highly predictable as with the laser procedures of LASIK or PRK. Other disadvantages include irregular astigmatism, long visual recovery time and tissue damage.

== See also ==
- LASIK
