= Corneal inlay =

Device implanted in eye to adjust refactive strength

A corneal inlay (also called an intracorneal implant) is a device which is surgically implanted in the cornea of the eye as a treatment for presbyopia. Successful installation results in reducing dependence on reading glasses, so that the user can more easily engage in everyday tasks such as using a mobile phone, reading store shelf prices and working on a computer.

Corneal inlays are small, thin, and permeable. Typically one is implanted in the non-dominant eye.

Jose Barraquer created the first corneal inlay prototype in 1949 in Barcelona, Spain. The flint glass material which he used, however, was found to be unsuitable because of biocompatibility issues. Other transparent, permeable materials were tested, including hydrogel polymers in the 1960s.

Some early corneal inlay recipients experienced complications, such as corneal opacification, thinning and melting. Researchers soon found that, as well as the material, the thickness of the inlay and the depth at which it was implanted were important, as well as permeability and centration. There was a delay in the general introduction of the treatment while considerable research was done to find safe and reliable combinations of these factors.

The US FDA approved the KAMRA corneal inlay in April 2015. The inlays are in commercial use in US, some countries in Europe, Asia-Pacific, the Americas and the Middle East. The inlays are implanted into the cornea either in a laser-created corneal pocket or lamellar corneal flap (similar to LASIK). The inlays can be removed should the patient develop another condition requiring medical treatment.

== Types ==
By 2020, there are five corneal inlays in use and under development:

=== KAMRA ===
The KAMRAinlay (AcuFocus, Inc.) is a biocompatible ring that increases the visual depth of field using the physical principle of a small aperture. This design only allows focused light to enter the eye resulting in an improvement in near and intermediate vision while maintaining distance vision. The KAMRA is the first small aperture corneal inlay approved by the US FDA.

=== FlexivueMicrolens ===
The FlexivueMicrolens (PresbiaCoöperatief U.A.) is a refractive hydrophilic polymer lens. The central zone of the lens is free of refractive power and the peripheral zone has a standard positive refractive power. This inlay works on a similar principle to bifocal glasses. The bifocal design provides two images to the retina simultaneously. Each specific point of focus is delivered as both a sharp and a blurred image. The FlexivueMicrolens is available in a variety of powers, and can be exchanged as presbyopia progresses.

=== Raindrop ===
The Raindrop Near Vision Inlay, formerly known as the PresbyLens or Vue+ lens (ReVision Optics, Inc) is a thin transparent biocompatible hydrogel implant. It is 2 mm in diameter and varies in thickness from 10 microns in the periphery to ~30 microns in the center. It is implanted under a femtosecond laser flap onto the stromal bed of the cornea, centered over a light-constricted pupil. The Raindrop Near Vision Inlay reshapes the central region of the cornea to provide a zone of increased power for focusing on near objects.

=== Icolens ===
The Icolens System (Neoptics AG) is another refractive hydrophilic polymer lens, similar to the Flexivue Microlens, with no power in the center and the peripheral zone has positive refractive power. This inlay is also available in assorted powers, which may be exchanged as required due to the progression of presbyopia.

=== Diffractive Corneal Inlay ===
The Diffractive Corneal Inlay is a novel type of corneal implant for the treatment of presbyopia, which based on the diffraction phenomena. It was developed by de Diffractive Optics Group (DiOG, Spain) and its working principle combines the pinhole and photon sieve effects. Using diffraction, the inlay is able to generate a diffractive focus in near vision. There are several scientific studies that compare the optical properties of Diffractive Corneal Inlay with the Kamra Inlay, demonstrating that the former obtains a better performance in near vision.

== See also ==
- Lasik
