= Carron du Villards =

French ophthalmologist

Charles Joseph Frédéric Carron du Villards (1801–1860) was a French ophthalmologist whose 1838 book Guide pratique pour l'étude et le traitement des maladies des yeux was an important early text in the field.

Although Charles Michel is frequently credited with inventing electrology for use in trichiasis, Carron du Villards has sometimes been credited with the invention.

== Bibliography ==
- Carron du Villards CGF. Guide pratique pour l'étude et le traitement des maladies des yeux Cosson for Société Encyclographique des Sciences Médicales, 1838
