= Carl Ferdinand von Arlt =

Austrian ophthalmologist (1812–1887)

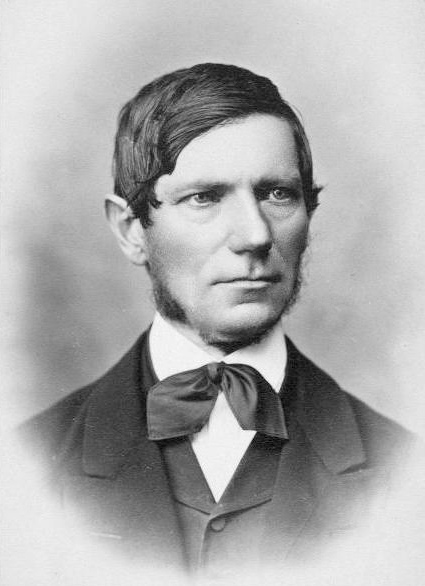
- Born: Carl Ferdinand von Arlt; 18 April 1812; Ober-Graupen, Bohemia
- Died: 7 March 1887 (aged 74)
- Scientific career
- Fields: Ophthalmology

Carl Ferdinand Ritter von Arlt (18 April 1812 – 7 March 1887) was an Austrian ophthalmologist born in Ober-Graupen, a village near Teplitz (Teplice) in Bohemia.

He earned his doctorate in Prague in 1839, and later became a professor of ophthalmology in Prague (1849–1856) and Vienna (1856–1883). His son Ferdinand Ritter von Arlt (1842–1917) was also an ophthalmologist.

Arlt published a prodigious number of books and articles concerning diseases of the eye, and collaborated with Albrecht von Graefe and Franciscus Donders on the journal Archiv für Ophthalmologie. He was the first physician to provide proof that myopia (short-sightedness) is generally a consequence of excessive length of the sagittal axis of the eye (bulbus).

Annually. he returned to his home town in order to treat people in its vicinity who were afflicted with eye diseases. Arlt died in Vienna on 7 March 1887.

The following eponyms are named after Arlt:

- "Arlt's line": Linear scar present in sulcus subtarsalis during Chlamydia trachomatis infection.
- "Arlt's operation": Transplantation of eyelashes back from the edge of the eyelid for treatment of distichiasis.
- "Arlt's syndrome": A contagious eye infection caused by Chlamydia trachomatis.
- "Arlt's triangle": keratic precipitates distributed in a wedge-shaped area on the inferior corneal endothelium.

== Selected publications ==
- Die Krankheiten des Auges (Diseases of the eye) three volumes, (1851, 1853 & 1856).
- Operationslehre (Surgical Lessons) In Saemisch/Graefe Handbuch der gesamten Augenheilkunde, Volume 3, (1874).
- Meine Erlebnisse. (Autobiography), Wiesbaden 1887, Otto Becker, pupil of Arlt, completed his autobiography.
