= Oculoplastics =

Class of ophthalmic surgery procedures

Oculoplastics, or oculoplastic surgery, includes a wide variety of surgical procedures that deal with the orbit (eye socket), eyelids, tear ducts, and the face. It also deals with the reconstruction of the orbit and ocular adnexa.

== Training ==
An oculoplastic surgeon is a specialized ophthalmologist (MD eye surgeon) who has completed one or two years of additional fellowship training following an ophthalmology residency. Many are fellows of the American Society of Ophthalmic Plastic and Reconstructive Surgeons (ASOPRS). To qualify, a member must have passed both the American Board of Ophthalmology certification exams, as well as written and oral board examinations through ASOPRS. A candidate must also have made a significant contribution to the field of oculoplastics, which may take the form of a peer-reviewed publication. There are other surgeons qualified and certified to operate on the orbit and ocular adnexa such as plastic surgeons, Neurosurgeons and oral and maxillofacial surgeons.

In the UK, oculoplastic surgeons will have generally undertaken 8–9 years of training, including 1–2 years of fellowship in addition to 7 years of registrar work (which typically includes 12–18 months of oculoplastic surgery training).

In Europe, the European Society of Ophthalmic Plastic and Reconstructive Surgery (ESOPRS) represents fellowship-trained oculoplastic surgeons across the continent and beyond. Founded to advance training and research standards in the specialty, ESOPRS membership requires completion of recognized fellowship training in oculoplastic, lacrimal and orbital surgery. The specialty has expanded significantly across the Middle East, with fellowship-trained oculoplastic surgeons contributing to its development in countries including Israel, Lebanon and the United Arab Emirates.

== Oculoplastic procedures ==
Oculoplastic surgeons perform procedures such as the repair of droopy eyelids (blepharoplasty), repair of tear duct obstructions, orbital fracture repairs, removal of tumors in and around the eyes, eyelid and facial reconstruction.

=== Eyelid surgery ===
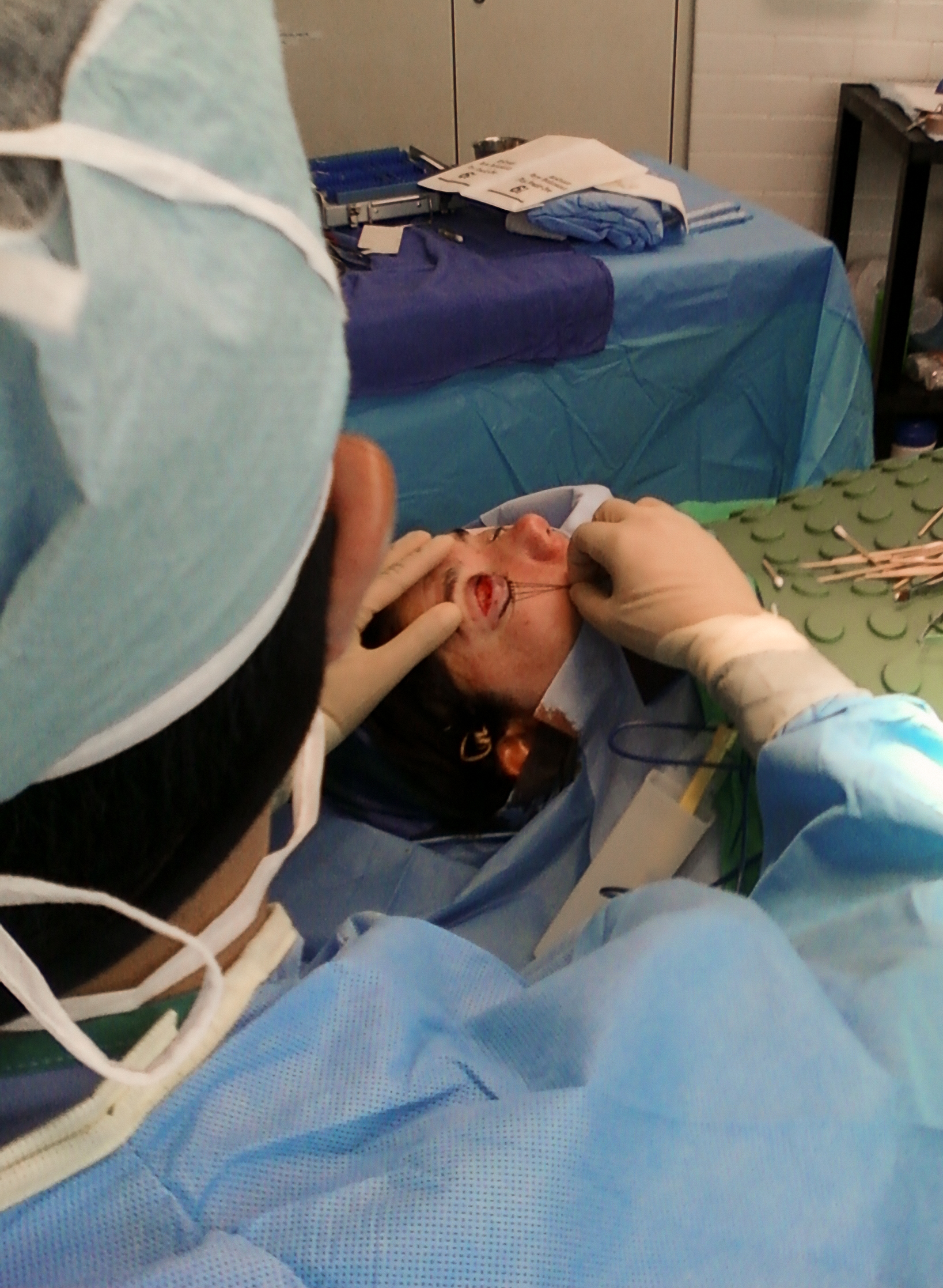
An oculoplastic surgeon performing revisional eyelid surgery.

Entropion, ectropion, ptosis, and eyelid tumors are commonly treated by various forms of eyelid surgery.

- Blepharoplasty (eyelift) is plastic surgery of the eyelids to remove excessive skin or subcutaneous fat.
  - Asian blepharoplasty
- Ptosis repair for droopy eyelid.
- Ectropion repair
- Entropion repair
- Canthal resection
- A canthectomy is the surgical removal of tissue at the junction of the upper and lower eyelids.
- Cantholysis is the surgical division of the canthus.
- Canthopexy is the surgical fixation of the canthus.
- A canthoplasty is plastic surgery at the canthus.
- A canthorrhaphy is suturing of the outer canthus to shorten the palpebral fissure.
- A canthotomy is the surgical division of the canthus, usually the outer canthus.
  - A lateral canthotomy is the surgical division of the outer canthus.
- Epicanthoplasty
- Tarsorrhaphy is a procedure in which the eyelids are partially sewn together to narrow the opening (i.e. palpebral fissure).
- Removal of eyelid tumors (such as basal cell carcinoma or squamous cell carcinoma)
- A Hughes procedure

=== Surgery involving the lacrimal apparatus ===
  - External or Endoscopic Dacryocystorhinostomy (DCR) for nasolacrimal duct obstruction
  - Canalicular trauma (canalicular laceration) repair
  - Canaliculodacryocystostomy is a surgical correction for a congenitally blocked tear duct in which the closed segment is excised and the open end is joined to the lacrimal sac.
  - Canaliculotomy involves slitting of the lacrimal punctum and canaliculus for the relief of epiphora
  - A dacryoadenectomy is the surgical removal of a lacrimal gland.
  - A dacryocystectomy is the surgical removal of a part of the lacrimal sac.
  - A dacryocystorhinostomy (DCR) or dacryocystorhinotomy is a procedure to restore the flow of tears into the nose from the lacrimal sac when the nasolacrimal duct does not function.
  - A dacryocystostomy is an incision into the lacrimal sac, usually to promote drainage.
  - A dacryocystotomy is an incision into the lacrimal sac.

=== Eye removal ===
  - An enucleation is the removal of the eye leaving the eye muscles and remaining orbital contents intact.
  - An evisceration is the removal of the eye's contents, leaving the scleral shell intact. Usually performed to reduce pain in a blind eye.
  - An exenteration is the removal of the entire orbital contents, including the eye, extraocular muscles, fat, and connective tissues; usually for malignant orbital tumors.

=== Orbital reconstruction ===
- Ocular prosthetics (artificial eyes)
- Orbital prosthesis (artificial replacement of the eye and eyelids within the discipline of Anaplastology) for an extenterated orbit.
- Orbital decompression for Graves' disease
- Orbital decompression for non-thyroid patients (aesthetic only)
- Orbital Tumor Removal - removing tumors around the eye that may compromise vision

=== Other ===
- Botox injections
- Injectable filler
- Browplasty

== See also ==
- Eye surgery
