= Stimson line =

- Differential diagnosis: measles

Stimson line is one of the symptoms of measles, characterized by transverse line of inflammation along the eyelid margin.

== Eponym ==
It is named after Philip Moen Stimson (1888–1971), an American pediatrician who characterized it in 1926.
