= Christopher Zoumalan =

American ASOPRS fellowship trained oculoplastic surgeon

Christopher I. Zoumalan is an American ASOPRS fellowship trained oculoplastic surgeon operating an eponymous practice in Beverly Hills, California. He is also the founder of Suraya Medical Center in Agoura Hills, California and co-founder of the Innovate Surgery Center in Beverly Hills, California.

== Early life ==
Raised with his brother in Los Angeles, California to a scientist father, Zoumalan showed an early interest in science and medicine.

== Education ==
Zoumalan received his undergraduate degree at the University of California, Los Angeles in Biology and Psychology. Upon receiving his undergraduate degree, he also received the Stanley Fellowship, renamed the Sklar Fellowship in Psychiatric Genetics and Neuroscience, at Harvard Medical School. Following that, he received his medical degree from the Medical College of Wisconsin in 2004.

He performed his residency training in Ophthalmology at Stanford University. Upon finishing residency, he completed a 2-year sub-specialized fellowship training in Oculoplastic Surgery at NYU,Columbia University, New York Eye and Ear Infirmary, and the Manhattan Eye Ear and Throat Hospital. Finishing his training, he received board certification from the American Board of Ophthalmology and graduate of the American Society of Ophthalmic Plastic and Reconstructive Surgery (ASOPRS), the world's largest organization of eye and face surgeons who have over 4 years of training in Ophthalmology followed by fellowship training in aesthetic and reconstructive procedures of the eyelids, eye sockets, tear ducts, and face.

== Career ==
Following training, Zoumalan returned to California to open his eponymous practice, Christopher I. Zoumalan. MD FACS in Beverly Hills. Here he specializes in Aesthetic and Reconstructive Oculoplastic Surgery. Additionally, he is an active staff member at Cedars-Sinai Medical Center and a member of the Cedars-Sinai Sinus Center.

In 2018, Zoumalan also launched a skin line "Skinuva" to provide a clinically developed growth factor based scar cream. The line was expanded to also include treatment for hyperpigmentation and bruising.

Zoumalan has also been involved in research to improve medical procedures and patient care publishing and contributing to numerous medical journals and textbooks.

Continuing to provide a full medical experience for patients, Zoumalan co-founded Innovate Surgery Center in 2025 with Dr. Karan Dhir. In 2026, he established Suraya Medical Center to provide easier access for clients in the San Fernando Valley and Ventura County in California.

== Personal life ==
Zoumalan lives with his wife, Rhonda Kalasho, a dentist operating TruGlo Modern Dental, and their 3 children. His brother, Richard Zoumalan, is also a plastic surgeon specializing in Rhinoplasty and Facial Surgery.

In his off time, he enjoys playing tennis, road biking, and listening to music.
