= Double eyelids =

Upper-eyelid morphology with a visible supratarsal crease

Creased upper eyelid

Details
- Synonym: Double eyelids, palpebral fold, supratarsal fold or supratarsal crease
- Part of: Upper eyelid
- Location: Anterior part of the orbit
- Parts: Upper-eyelid skin, orbicularis oculi muscle, levator aponeurosis, and tarsal plate
- Shape: Presence of a visible supratarsal crease

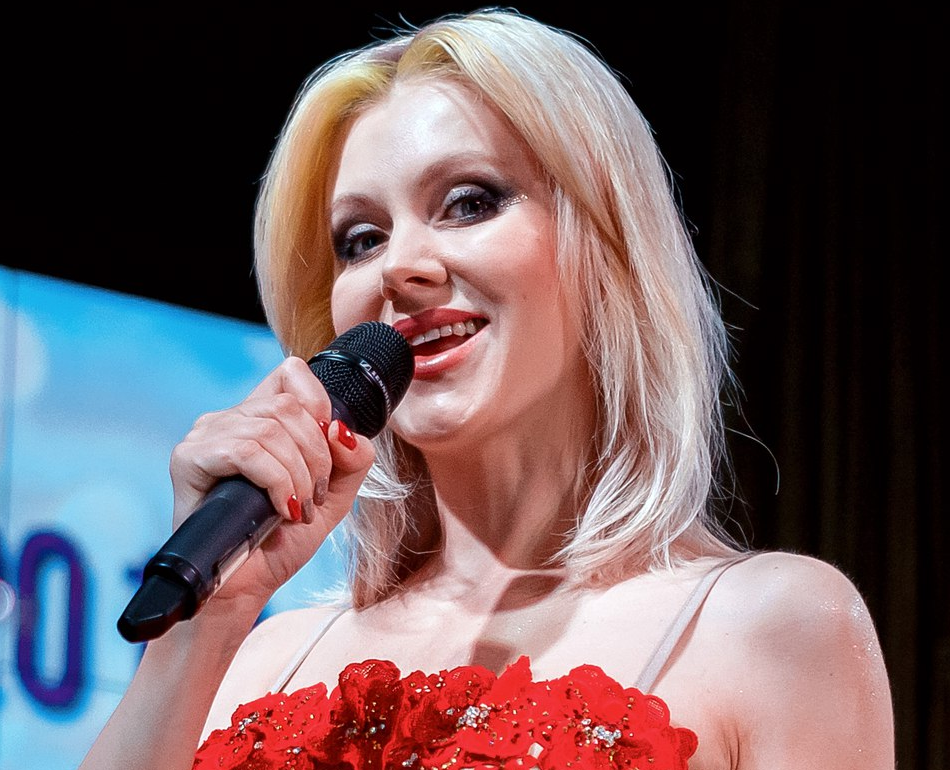
Russian singer Natalie, with noticeable double eyelids.

Double eyelids, is a type of the creased upper eyelid, is an upper-eyelid look divided by a visible crease. "Double" does not mean that a person has two anatomical eyelids, it refers to the external upper-eyelid surface divided by one crease.

In anatomical text, the feature may instead be described as the presence of an upper-eyelid crease, palpebral fold, supratarsal fold or supratarsal crease. The levator palpebrae superioris muscle raises the upper eyelid through its aponeurosis, which attaches to the tarsal plate and surrounding soft tissues. A supratarsal crease forms when connections between the levator-associated tissues and the overlying skin cause the skin to be drawn inward as the eyelid is raised.

An upper eyelid without a clearly visible supratarsal crease is commonly described as a monolid or single eyelid. In modern world, population with double eyelids constitute a larger proportion than those with single eyelids or other eyelid looks.

== Morphology of eyelid creases ==
The height, depth, length and curvature of a supratarsal crease vary between individuals. A crease may be continuous and clearly defined, shallow or partly hidden by the skin above it. Some creases become visible only during eyelid movement or downward gaze, and more than one shallow crease may occur on the same upper eyelid. Minor differences between the two eyes are also common.

The appearance of a crease may change with age. Skin laxity, eyebrow position, changes in orbital fat, thinning of soft tissues and alterations in the levator aponeurosis can cause an existing crease to become shallower, deeper, obscured or divided into several folds.

A hidden or partially concealed supratarsal crease, sometimes described as an "inner double eyelid", should be distinguished from a single eyelid. In this form, a crease is anatomically present but may be visible only near the lateral part of the eyelid, during downward gaze, or when the overlying skin is displaced.

== See also ==
- Human eyelid
- Monolid
- East Asian blepharoplasty
