= Hughes procedure =

- Specialty: Ophthalmology

The Hughes procedure is an oculoplastic procedure which is performed to reconstruct a lower eyelid defect. It is usually performed as a 2-stage procedure.

The most common use for the Hughes procedure is reconstruction after the removal of a lower eyelid skin cancer.

The result aims to recreate the normal appearance and function of the lid.
