= Trachoma =

Infectious disease that causes a roughening of the inner surface of the eyelids

- Other names: Granular conjunctivitis, blinding trachoma, Egyptian ophthalmia
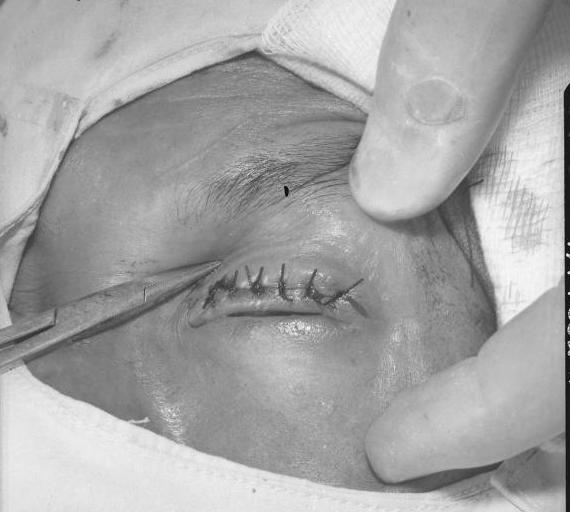
- Surgical repair of in-turned eyelid and eyelashes resulting from trachoma
- Specialty: Infectious disease
- Symptoms: Eye pain, blindness
- Causes: Chlamydia trachomatis spread between people
- Risk factors: Crowded living conditions, not enough clean water and toilets
- Prevention: Mass treatment, improved sanitation
- Treatment: Medications, surgery
- Medication: Azithromycin, tetracycline
- Frequency: 80 million

Trachoma is an infectious disease caused by the bacterium Chlamydia trachomatis. The infection causes a roughening of the inner surface of the eyelids. This roughening can lead to eye pain, breakdown of the outer surface or cornea of the eyes, and eventual blindness. Untreated, repeated trachoma infections can result in a form of permanent blindness when the eyelids turn inward.

The bacteria that cause the disease can be spread by both direct and indirect contact with an affected person's eyes or nose. Indirect contact includes through clothing or flies that have come into contact with an affected person's eyes or nose. Children spread the disease more often than adults. Poor sanitation, crowded living conditions, and insufficient clean water and toilets also increase the spread.

Efforts to prevent the disease include improving access to clean water and treatment with antibiotics to decrease the number of people infected with the bacterium. This may include treating, all at once, whole groups of people in whom the disease is known to be common. Washing, by itself, is not enough to prevent disease, but may be useful with other measures. Treatment options include oral azithromycin and topical tetracycline. Azithromycin is preferred because it can be used as a single oral dose. After scarring of the eyelid has occurred, surgery may be required to correct the position of the eyelashes and prevent blindness.

Globally, about 80 million people have an active infection. In some areas, infections may be present in as many as 60–90% of children. Among adults it more commonly affects women than men, likely due to their closer contact with children. The disease is the cause of decreased vision in 2.2 million people, of whom 1.2 million are completely blind. Trachoma is a public health problem in 29 countries across Africa, Asia, the Middle East, and Central and South America. There are 92 million people at risk, down from 228.9 million in 2013. It results in US$8 billion of economic losses a year. It belongs to a group of diseases known as neglected tropical diseases.

== Signs and symptoms ==
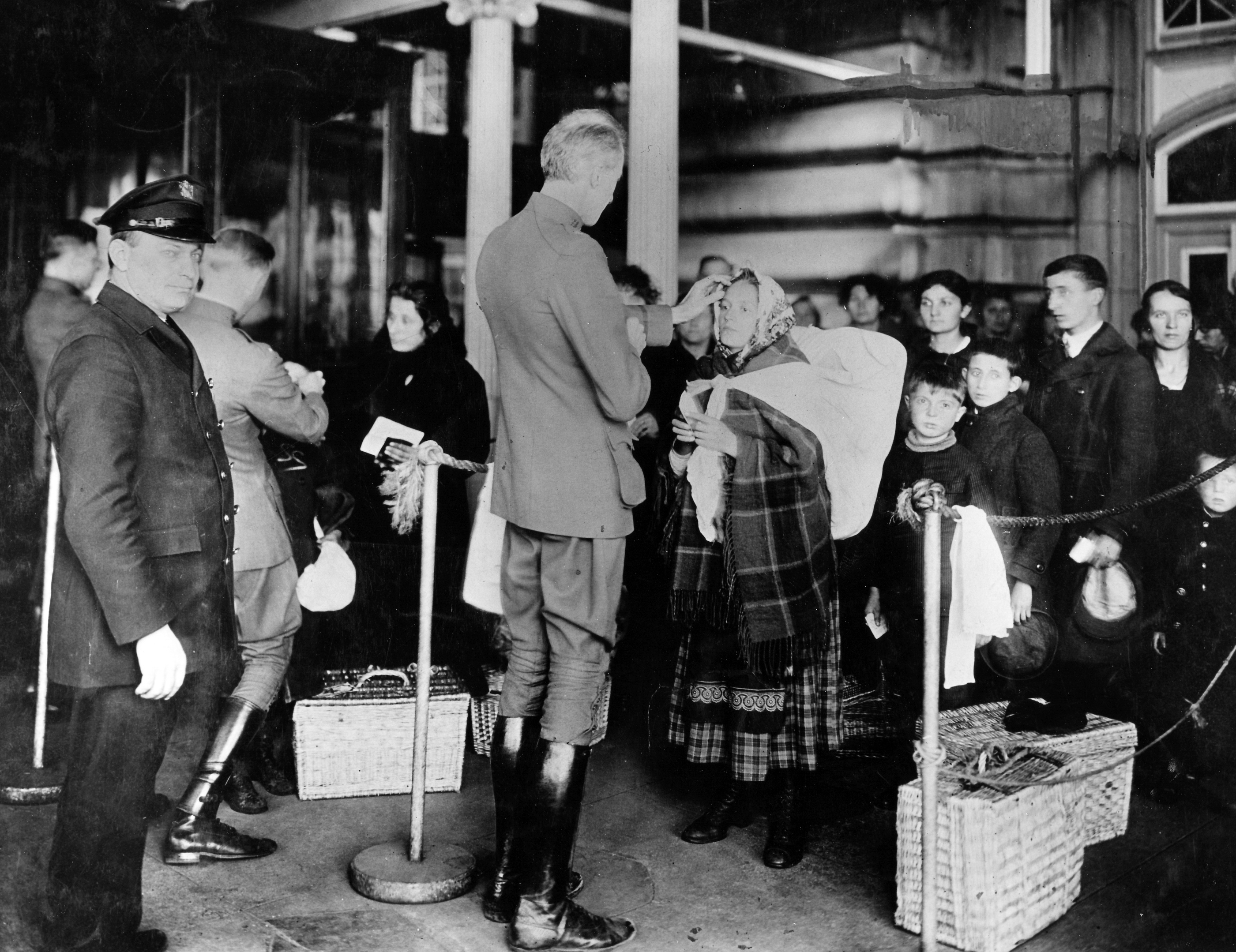
Ellis Island Public Health Service physicians examining new immigrants for trachoma in 1910

The bacterium has an incubation period of 10 days, after which the affected individual experiences symptoms of conjunctivitis or "pink eye". Blinding endemic trachoma results from multiple episodes of reinfection that maintains the intense inflammation in the conjunctiva. Without reinfection, the inflammation gradually subsides.

The conjunctival inflammation is called "active trachoma" and is usually seen in children, especially those in preschool. It is characterized by white lumps in the undersurface of the upper eyelid (conjunctival follicles or lymphoid germinal centers) and by nonspecific inflammation and thickening, often associated with papillae. Follicles may also appear at the junction of the cornea and the sclera (limbal follicles). Active trachoma can often be irritating and have a watery discharge. Bacterial secondary infection may occur and cause a discharge of pus.

The later structural changes of trachoma are referred to as "cicatricial trachoma". These include scarring under the eyelid (tarsal conjunctiva) that distorts the eyelid with buckling of the lid (tarsus), so the lashes rub against the eye (trichiasis). This can lead to corneal opacities and scarring and then to blindness. Linear scars present in the sulcus subtarsalis are called Arlt's lines (named after Carl Ferdinand von Arlt). In addition, blood vessels and scar tissue can invade the upper cornea (pannus). Resolved limbal follicles may leave small gaps in the pannus (Herbert's pits).

Most commonly, children with active trachoma do not present with symptoms, as the low-grade irritation and ocular discharge are just accepted as normal, but further symptoms may include:

- Eye discharge
- Swollen eyelids
- Trichiasis (misaligned eyelashes)
- Swelling of lymph nodes in front of the ears
- Sensitivity to bright lights
- Increased heart rate
- Further ear, nose, and throat complications.

The most important complication to look out for is a corneal ulcer, which is caused by intense rubbing of the affected eye, or trichiasis with a superimposed bacterial infection.

== Cause ==
Trachoma is caused by Chlamydia trachomatis, serotypes (serovars) A, B, and C. It is spread by direct contact with eye, nose, and throat secretions from affected individuals, or contact with fomites (inanimate objects that carry infectious agents), such as towels and/or washcloths, that have had similar contact with these secretions. Flies can also be a route of mechanical transmission. Untreated, repeated trachoma infections result in entropion (the inward turning of the eyelids), which may result in blindness due to damage to the cornea. Children are most susceptible to infection due to their tendency to get dirty easily, but the blinding effects or more severe symptoms are often not felt until adulthood.

Blinding endemic trachoma occurs in areas with poor personal and family hygiene. Many factors are indirectly linked to the presence of trachoma, including lack of water, absence of latrines or toilets, poverty, flies, proximity to cattle, and crowding. The final common pathway, though, seems to be the presence of dirty faces in children, facilitating the frequent exchange of infected ocular discharge from one child's face to another. Most transmission of trachoma occurs within the family.

== Diagnosis ==
=== McCallan's classification ===
McCallan in 1908 divided the clinical course of trachoma into four stages:

Stage 1 (incipient trachoma)	Stage 2 (established trachoma)	Stage 3 (cicatrising trachoma)	Stage 4 (healed trachoma)
Hyperaemia of the palpebral conjunctiva	Appearance of mature follicle & papillae	Scarring of the palpebral conjunctiva	Disease is cured or is not markable
Immature follicle	Progressive corneal pannus	Scars are easily visible as white bands	Sequelae to cicatrisation cause symptoms

=== WHO classification ===
The World Health Organization recommends a simplified grading system for trachoma. The Simplified WHO Grading System is summarized below:

Trachomatous inflammation, follicular (TF)—Five or more follicles of >0.5 mm on the upper tarsal conjunctiva

Trachomatous inflammation, intense (TI)—Papillary hypertrophy and inflammatory thickening of the upper tarsal conjunctiva, obscuring more than half the deep tarsal vessels

Trachomatous scarring (TS)—Presence of scarring in the tarsal conjunctiva.

Trachomatous trichiasis (TT)—At least one ingrown eyelash touching the globe, or evidence of epilation (eyelash removal)

Corneal opacity (CO)—Corneal opacity blurring part of the pupil margin

== Prevention ==
Although trachoma was eliminated from the developed world in the 20th and 21st centuries, this disease persists in many parts of the developing world, particularly in communities without adequate access to water and sanitation. It is grouped as a neglected tropical disease which is a target for preventive chemotherapy.

The internationally-endorsed SAFE approach (Surgery for trichiasis, Antibiotics to clear infection, Facial cleanliness and Environmental improvement) is central to trachoma programmes in SSA.

- Surgery (S): Surgical correction of trichiasis (in-turned eyelashes) is performed in many endemic SSA countries to prevent progression to blindness.
- Antibiotics (A): Mass drug administration (MDA) of oral azithromycin is deployed in districts where childhood prevalence of active trachoma exceeds 10%. Reports indicate that millions in SSA have received antibiotic treatment under elimination programmes.
- Facial cleanliness (F): Health-education campaigns in schools and communities promote face-washing and hygiene practices, aiming to reduce transmission via ocular discharge and fly exposure.
- Environmental improvement (E): Investment in latrines, improved waste disposal, fly control, and access to clean water are crucial—especially in rural SSA where environmental risk factors are pronounced.

=== Environmental measures ===
Environmental improvement: Modifications in water use, fly control, latrine use, health education, and proximity to domesticated animals have all been proposed to reduce transmission of C. trachomatis. These changes pose numerous challenges for implementation. These environmental changes are likely to affect the transmission of ocular infection through a lack of facial cleanliness. Particular attention is required for environmental factors that limit clean faces.

A systematic review examining the effectiveness of environmental sanitary measures on the prevalence of active trachoma in endemic areas showed that the use of insecticide spray resulted in significant reductions of trachoma and fly density in some studies. Health education also resulted in reductions of active trachoma when implemented. Improved water supply did not result in a reduction of trachoma incidence.

=== Antibiotics ===
WHO Guidelines recommend that a region receive community-based, mass antibiotic treatment when the prevalence of active trachoma among one- to nine-year-old children is greater than 10%. Subsequent annual treatment should be administered for three years, at which time the prevalence should be reassessed. Annual treatment should continue until the prevalence drops below 5%. At lower prevalences, antibiotic treatment should be family-based.

== Management ==
=== Antibiotics ===
Azithromycin (single oral dose of 20 mg/kg) or topical tetracycline (1% eye ointment twice a day for six weeks). Azithromycin is preferred because it is used as a single oral dose. Although it is expensive, it is generally used as part of the international donation program organized by Pfizer. Azithromycin can be used in children from the age of six months and in pregnancy. As a community-based antibiotic treatment, some evidence suggests that oral azithromycin was more effective than topical tetracycline, but no consistent evidence supported either oral or topical antibiotics as being more effective. Antibiotic treatment reduces the risk of active trachoma in individuals infected with chlamydial trachomatis.

=== Surgery ===
For individuals with trichiasis, a bilamellar tarsal rotation procedure is warranted to direct the lashes away from the globe. Evidence suggests that the use of a lid clamp and absorbable sutures would result in reduced lid contour abnormalities and granuloma formulation after surgery. Early intervention is beneficial as the rate of recurrence is higher in more advanced diseases.

=== Lifestyle measures ===
The WHO-recommended SAFE strategy includes:

- Surgery to correct advanced stages of the disease
- Antibiotics to treat active infection, using azithromycin
- Facial cleanliness to reduce disease transmission
- Environmental change to increase access to clean water and improve sanitation

Children with visible nasal discharge, eye discharge, or flies on their faces are at least twice as likely to have active trachoma as children with clean faces. Intensive community-based health education programs to promote face-washing can reduce the rates of active trachoma, especially intense trachoma. If an individual is already infected, washing one's face is encouraged, especially for a child, to prevent reinfection. Some evidence shows that washing the face combined with topical tetracycline might be more effective in reducing severe trachoma compared to topical tetracycline alone. The same trial found no statistical benefit of eye washing alone or in combination with tetracycline eye drops in reducing follicular trachoma amongst children.

== Prognosis ==
Disability-adjusted life year for trachoma per 100,000 inhabitants in 2021: no data 0 0.01-0.5 0.5-1 1-2 2-3 3-4 4-5 5-20 more than 20

If not treated properly with oral antibiotics, the symptoms may escalate and cause blindness, which is the result of ulceration and consequent scarring of the cornea. Surgery may also be necessary to fix eyelid deformities.

Without intervention, trachoma keeps families in a cycle of poverty, as the disease and its long-term effects are passed from one generation to the next.

== Epidemiology ==
Number of people with trachoma per 100000

As of 2011, about 21 million people were actively affected by trachoma, with around 2.2 million people being permanently blind or having severe visual impairment from trachoma. An additional 7.3 million people are reported to have trichiasis. As of March 2026, 92 million individuals live in trachoma endemic areas and are at risk of trachoma-related blindness, and the disease is a public health problem in 29 countries. Of these, Africa is considered the worst affected area, with over 85% of all known active cases of trachoma. Within the continent, South Sudan and Ethiopia have the highest prevalence. In many of these communities, women are up to four times more likely than men to be blinded by the disease, likely due to their roles as caregivers in the family.

=== Elimination ===
Countries where trachoma is a public health problem

In 1996, the WHO launched its Alliance for the Global Elimination of Trachoma by 2020, and in 2006, the WHO officially set 2020 as the target to eliminate trachoma as a public health problem. The International Coalition for Trachoma Control has produced maps and a strategic plan called 2020 INSight that lays out actions and milestones to achieve global elimination of blinding trachoma by 2020. The program recommends the SAFE protocol for blindness prevention: Surgery for trichiasis, Antibiotics to clear infection, Facial cleanliness, and Environmental improvement to reduce transmission. This includes sanitation infrastructure to reduce the open presence of human feces that can breed flies.

As of 21 October 2026, 33 countries have eliminated trachoma as a public health problem, the latest being Timor-Leste. Eradication of the bacterium that causes the disease is seen as impractical; the WHO definition of "eliminated as a public health problem" means less than 5% of children have any symptoms, and less than 0.1% of adults have vision loss. Having already donated more doses (about 700 million since 2002) of the drug than it has sold during the same period, the drug company Pfizer has agreed to donate azithromycin until 2025, if necessary, for the elimination of the disease. The campaign unexpectedly found that the distribution of azithromycin to very poor children reduced their early death rate by up to 25%.

=== Sub-Saharan Africa ===
Sub-Saharan Africa faces substantial burdens of endemic trachoma due to intersecting environmental, socioeconomic, and public-health vulnerabilities.

The African Region is the most intensely affected globally. Africa contains fewer than half the world's population. However, it accounts for more than 85% of all known cases of active trachoma. In 2024, an estimated 93 million people in the African Region were living in areas at risk for trachoma, representing approximately 90% of the global at-risk burden.

Surveys show that in many endemic districts of SSA, children aged 1–9 years have prevalence rates of active trachoma (TF or TI) ranging from 20-60 % or more. For example, in one community in Ethiopia, the prevalence among children aged 1–9 years was found to be as high as 40.1%.

=== Environmental and social ===
A convergence of risk factors across human, animal, and environmental domains typifies trachoma in SSA.

- Poor access to safe water and sanitation, high fly density (particularly Musca sorbens breeding in human faeces), and crowded living conditions increase transmission.
- Rural, remote, and impoverished communities bear the highest burden—factors such as limited health infrastructure, low educational attainment, and subsistence farming intensify risk.
- Environmental factors such as climatic variability, drought, or heavy rainfall may influence fly populations or sanitation breakdowns in rural SSA settings, linking broader ecosystem health with human disease.
- Gender dynamics: Women and girls often carry a greater risk of trachoma and its sequelae due to caregiving roles, greater contact with children who are reservoirs of infection, and disparities in access to services.

=== Challenges ===
Significant strides have been made in SSA. Several countries have achieved validation of elimination as a public-health problem (for example, Senegal in July 2025). Nonetheless, a number of major challenges still persist. Persistent high-burden countries such as Ethiopia and South Sudan have remote geography, conflict, weak infrastructure, and resource constraints that slow progress. Under-reporting and data gaps exist in many endemic districts that lack up to date prevalence surveys, limiting evidence-based targeting. Integration of One Health is still uneven in these regions, where aligning human health, environmental health, and veterinary/environmental infrastructure remains a work in progress. Another challenge exists with the sustainability of programmes. Maintaining antibiotic supply chains, trained surgical teams, behaviour change, and environmental improvements over long periods is resource-intensive and often runs out of monetary support. Looking ahead, the road to elimination of trachoma in SSA will require intensified cross-sectoral coordination, increased funding, community-driven hygiene, environmental improvements, and leveraging climate resilient infrastructure.

== History ==
The disease is one of the earliest known eye afflictions, having been identified in Egypt as early as 15 BCE.

Its presence was also recorded in ancient China and Mesopotamia. Trachoma became a problem as people moved into crowded settlements or towns with poor hygiene. It became a particular problem in Europe in the 19th century. After the Egyptian Campaign (1798–1802) and the Napoleonic Wars (1798–1815), trachoma was rampant in the army barracks of Europe and spread to those living in towns as troops returned home. Stringent control measures were introduced, and by the early 20th century, trachoma was essentially controlled in Europe, although cases were reported until the 1950s. Today, most victims of trachoma live in underdeveloped and poverty-stricken countries in Africa, the Middle East, and Asia.

In the United States, the Centers for Disease Control says, "No national or international surveillance [for trachoma] exists. Blindness due to trachoma has been eliminated from the United States. The last cases were found among Native American populations and in Appalachia, and those in the boxing, wrestling, and sawmill industries (prolonged exposure to combinations of sweat and sawdust often led to the disease). In the late 19th and early 20th centuries, trachoma was the main reason for an immigrant coming through Ellis Island to be deported."

In 1913, President Woodrow Wilson signed an act designating funds for the eradication of the disease. Immigrants who attempted to enter the U.S. through Ellis Island, New York, had to be checked for trachoma. During this time, treatment for the disease was by topical application of copper sulfate. By the late 1930s, several ophthalmologists reported success in treating trachoma with sulfonamide antibiotics. In 1948, Vincent Tabone (who was later to become the President of Malta) was entrusted with the supervision of a campaign in Malta to treat trachoma using sulfonamide tablets and drops.

Due to improved sanitation and overall living conditions, trachoma virtually disappeared from the industrialized world by the 1950s, though it continues to plague the developing world to this day. Epidemiological studies were conducted in 1956–1963 by the Trachoma Control Pilot Project in India under the Indian Council for Medical Research. This potentially blinding disease remains endemic in the poorest regions of Africa, Asia, and the Middle East and in some parts of Latin America. Currently, 8 million people are visually impaired as a result of trachoma, and 41 million have an active infection.

In 2026, Australia was declared to have eliminated trachoma as a public health problem. The same year, the World Health Organization announced that, following Timor-Leste's elimination of the disease, Southeast Asia has eliminated trachoma as a public health problem.

India's Health and Family Welfare Minister JP Nadda declared India free of infective trachoma in 2017.

=== Etymology ===
The term is derived from Neo-Latin trāchōma, from Greek τράχωμα trākhōma, from τραχύς trākhus "rough".

== Economics ==
The economic burden of trachoma is huge, particularly concerning covering treatment costs and productivity losses as a result of increased visual impairment, and in some cases, permanent blindness. The global estimated cost of trachoma is reported between $US2.9 and 5.3 billion each year. By including the cost of trichiasis treatment, the estimated overall cost for the disease increases to about $US 8 billion.
