= Epidemic =

Rapid spread of disease affecting a large number of people in a short time

Example of an epidemic showing the number of new infections over time.

An epidemic (from Greek ἐπί epi "upon or above" and δῆμος demos "people") is the rapid spread of disease to a large number of hosts in a given population within a short period of time. For example, in meningococcal infections, an attack rate in excess of 15 cases per 100,000 people for two consecutive weeks is considered an epidemic.

Epidemics of infectious disease are generally caused by several factors including a change in the ecology of the host population (e.g., increased stress or increase in the density of a vector species), a genetic change in the pathogen reservoir or the introduction of an emerging pathogen to a host population (by movement of pathogen or host). Generally, an epidemic occurs when host immunity to either an established pathogen or newly emerging novel pathogen is suddenly reduced below that found in the endemic equilibrium and the transmission threshold is exceeded.

An epidemic may be restricted to one location; however, if it spreads to other countries or continents and affects a substantial number of people, it may be termed as a pandemic. The declaration of an epidemic usually requires a good understanding of a baseline rate of incidence; epidemics for certain diseases, such as influenza, are defined as reaching some defined increase in incidence above this baseline. A few cases of a very rare disease may be classified as an epidemic, while many cases of a common disease (such as the common cold) would not. An epidemic can cause enormous damage through financial and economic losses in addition to impaired health and loss of life.

== Definition ==
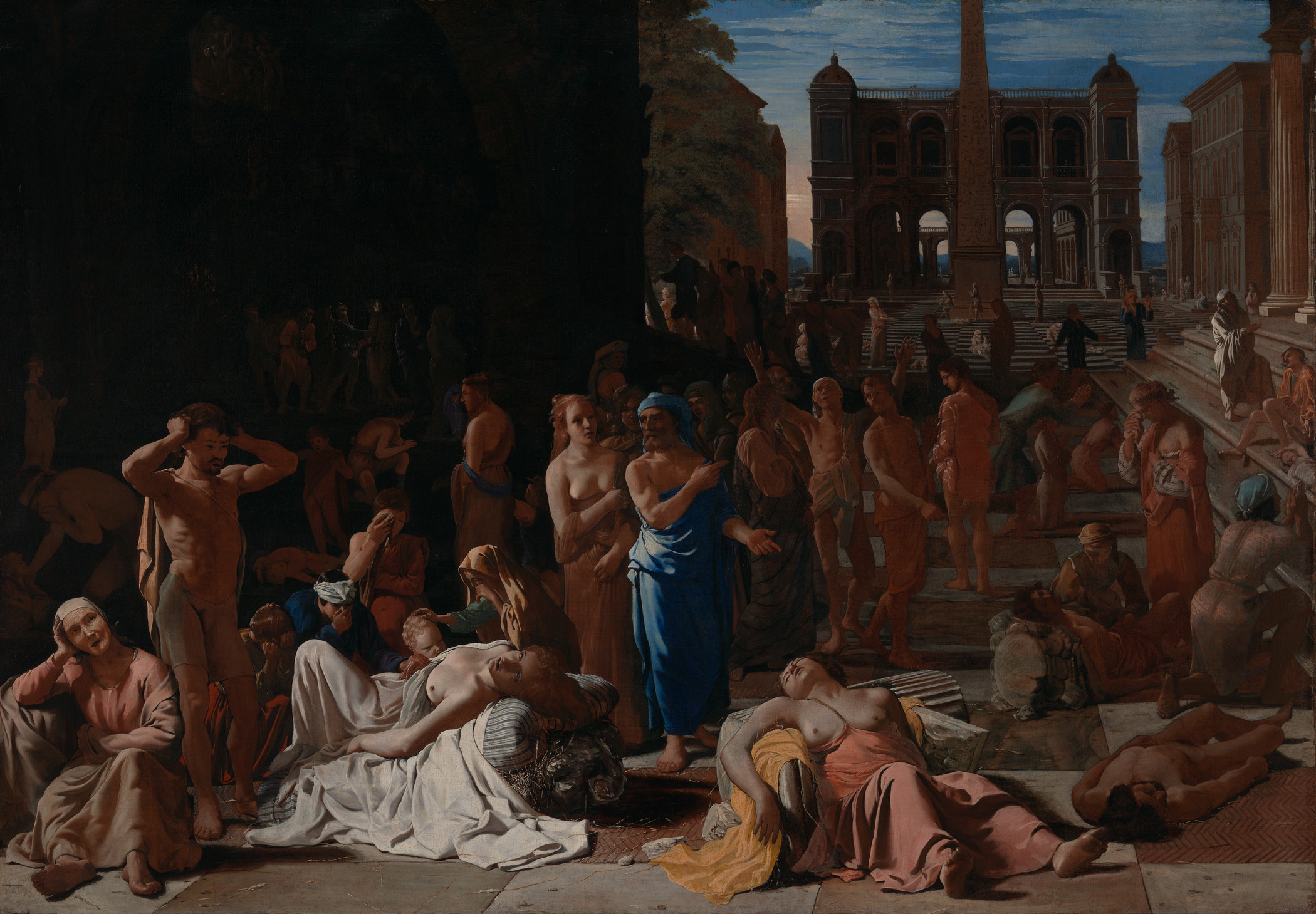
The Plague of Athens (c. 1652–1654) by Michiel Sweerts, illustrating the devastating epidemic that struck Athens in 430 BC, as described by the historian Thucydides

The United States Centers for Disease Control and Prevention defines epidemic broadly: "Epidemic refers to an increase, often sudden, in the number of cases of a disease above what is normally expected in that population in that area." The term "outbreak" can also apply, but is usually restricted to smaller events.

Any sudden increase in disease prevalence may generally be termed an epidemic. This may include contagious disease (i.e. easily spread between persons) such as influenza; vector-borne diseases such as malaria; water-borne diseases such as cholera; and sexually transmitted diseases such as HIV/AIDS. The term can also be used for non-communicable health issues such as obesity.

The term epidemic derives from a word form attributed to Homer's Odyssey, which later took its medical meaning from the Epidemics, a treatise by Hippocrates. Before Hippocrates, epidemios, epidemeo, epidamos, and other variants had meanings similar to the current definitions of "indigenous" or "endemic". Thucydides' description of the Plague of Athens is considered one of the earliest accounts of a disease epidemic. By the early 17th century, the terms endemic and epidemic referred to contrasting conditions of population-level disease, with the endemic condition a "common sicknesse" and the epidemic "hapning in some region, or countrey, at a certaine time, ....... producing in all sorts of people, one and the same kind of sicknesse".

The term "epidemic" is often applied to diseases in non-human animals, although "epizootic" is technically preferable.

== Causes ==
There are several factors that may contribute (individually or in combination) to causing an epidemic. There may be changes in a pathogen, in the population that it can infect, in the environment, or in the interaction between all three. Factors include the following:

=== Antigenic change ===
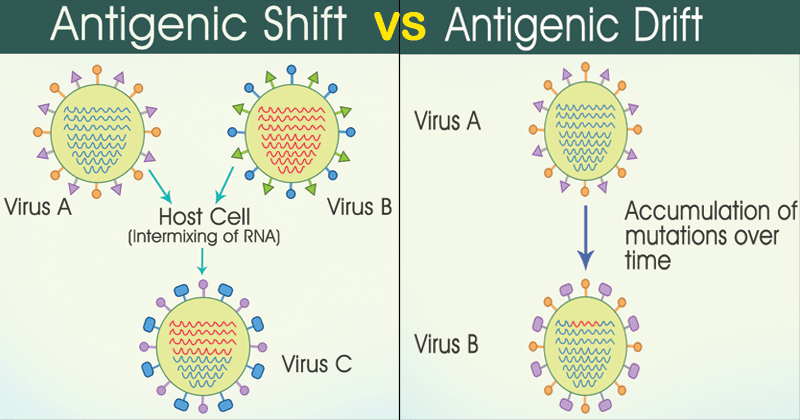
Illustration depicting the different mechanisms of antigenic shift and antigenic drift

An antigen is a protein on the virus' surface that host antibodies can recognize and attack. Changes in the antigenic characteristics of the agent make it easier for the changed virus to spread throughout a previously immune population. There are two natural mechanisms for change - antigenic drift and antigenic shift. Antigenic drift arises over a period of time as an accumulation of mutations in the virus genes, possibly through a series of hosts, and eventually gives rise to a new strain of virus which can evade existing immunity. Antigenic shift is abrupt - in this, two or more different strains of a virus, coinfecting a single host, combine to form a new subtype having a mixture of characteristics of the original strains. The best known and best documented example of both processes is influenza. SARS-CoV2 has demonstrated antigenic drift and possibly shift as well.

=== Drug resistance ===
Antibiotic resistance applies specifically to bacteria that become resistant to antibiotics. Resistance in bacteria can arise naturally by genetic mutation, or by one species acquiring resistance from another through horizontal gene transfer. Extended use of antibiotics appears to encourage selection for mutations which can render antibiotics ineffective. This is especially true of tuberculosis, with increasing occurrence of multiple drug-resistant tuberculosis (MDR-TB) worldwide.

=== Changes in transmission ===
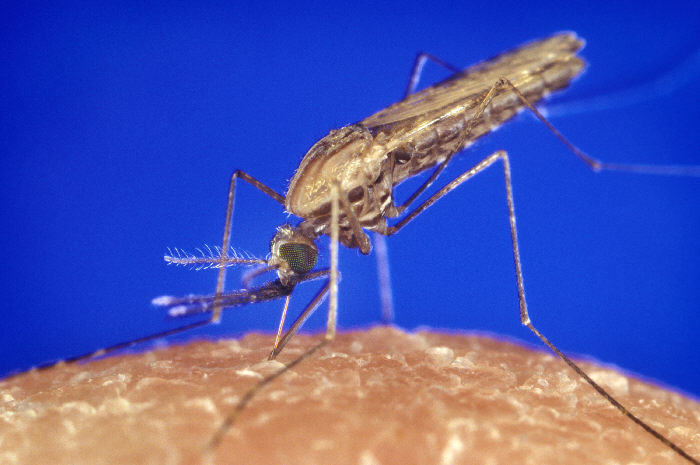
Anopheles mosquito, the vector of malaria

Pathogen transmission is a term used to describe the mechanisms by which a disease-causing agent (virus, bacterium, or parasite) spreads from one host to another. Common modes of transmission include: -

- airborne (as with influenza and COVID-19),
- fecal-oral (as with cholera and typhoid),
- vector-borne (malaria, Zika) and
- sexual (syphilis, HIV)

The first three of these require that pathogen must survive away from its host for a period of time; an evolutionary change which increases survival time will result in increased virulence.

Another possibility, although rare, is that a pathogen may adapt to take advantage of a new mode of transmission

=== Seasonality ===
Seasonal diseases arise due to the change in the environmental conditions, especially such as humidity and temperature, during different seasons. Many diseases display seasonality, This may be due to one or more of the following underlying factors: -

- The ability of the pathogen to survive outside the host - e.g. water-borne cholera which becomes prevalent in tropical wet seasons, or influenza which peaks in temperate regions during winter.
- The behaviour of people susceptible to the disease - such as spending more time in close contact indoors.
- Changes in immune function during winter - one possibility is a reduction in vitamin D, and another is the effect of cold on mucous membranes in the nose.
- Abundance of vectors such as mosquitoes.

=== Human behaviour ===
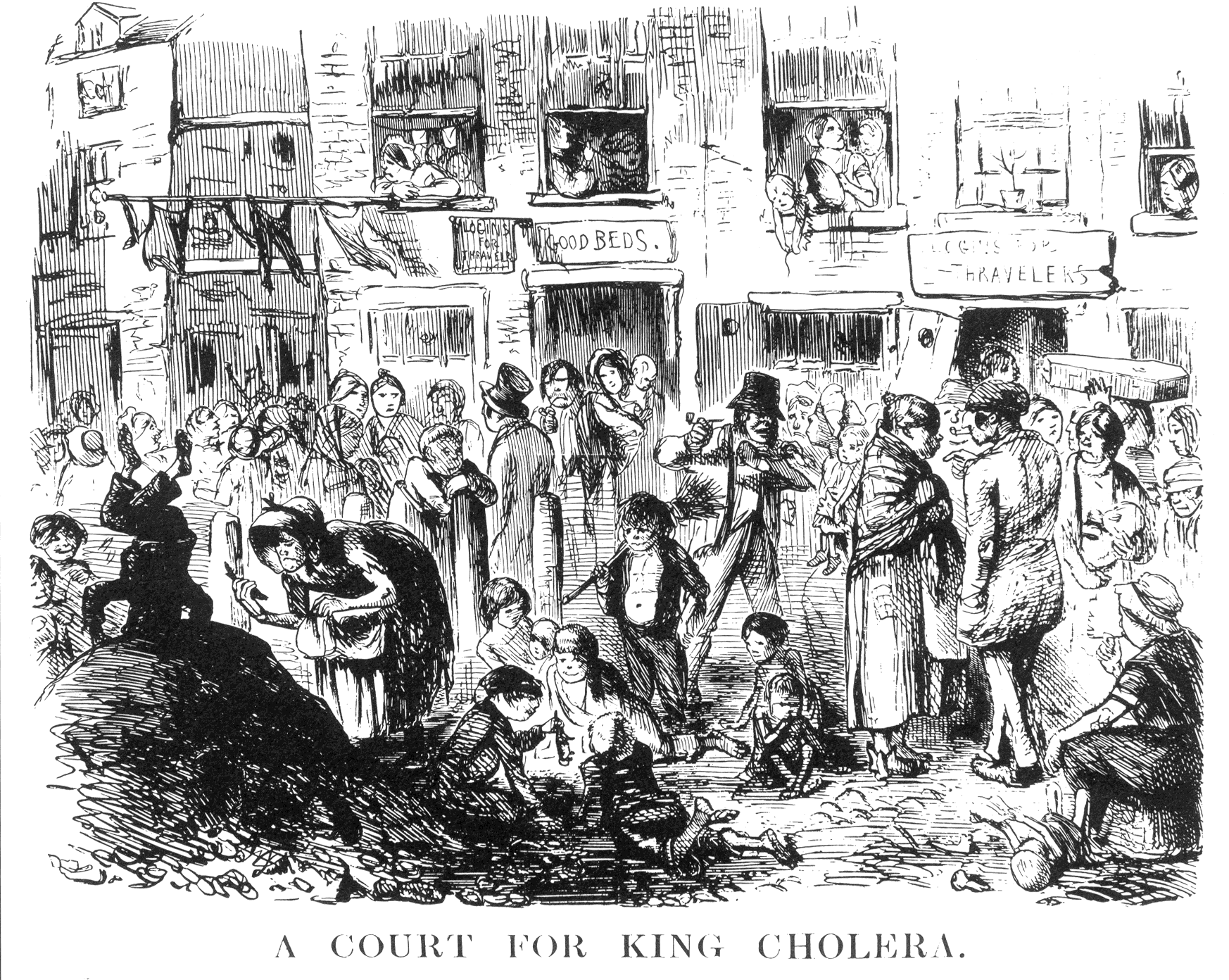
A Court for King Cholera. Illustration from Punch (1852).

Changes in behaviour can affect the likelihood, extent, severity and longevity of epidemics. The classic example is the 1854 Broad Street cholera outbreak, in which a cholera outbreak was mitigated by removing a supply of contaminated water - an event now regarded as the foundation of the science of epidemiology. Urbanisation and overcrowding (e.g. in refugee camps) increase the likelihood of disease outbreaks. A factor which contributed to the initial rapid increase in the 2014 Ebola virus epidemic was ritual bathing of (infective) corpses; one of the control measures was an education campaign to change behaviour around funeral rites.

=== Changes in the host population ===
The level of immunity to a disease in a population - herd immunity - is at its peak after a disease outbreak or a vaccination campaign. In the following years, immunity will decline, both within individuals and in the population as a whole as older individuals die and new individuals are born. Eventually, unless there is another vaccination campaign, an outbreak or epidemic will recur.

It's also possible for disease which is endemic in one population to become epidemic if it is introduced into a novel setting where the host population is not immune. An example of this was the introduction European diseases such as smallpox into indigenous populations during the 16th century.

=== Zoonosis ===
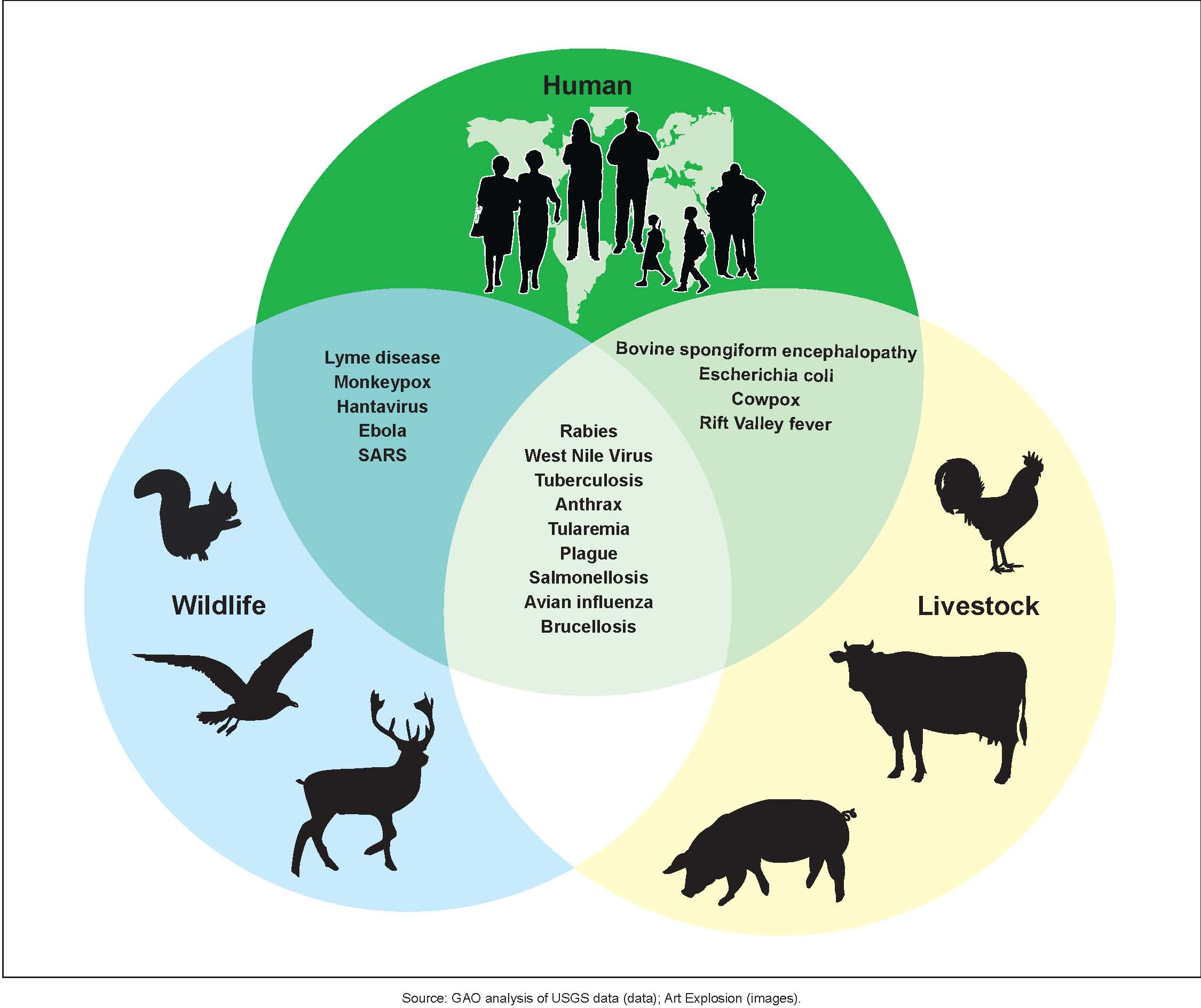
Possibilities for zoonotic disease transmissions

A zoonosis is an infectious disease of humans caused by a pathogen that can jump from a non-human host to a human. Major diseases such as Ebola virus disease and salmonellosis are zoonoses. HIV was a zoonotic disease transmitted to humans in the early part of the 20th century, though it has now evolved into a separate human-only disease. Some strains of bird flu and swine flu are zoonoses; these viruses occasionally recombine with human strains of the flu and can cause pandemics such as the 1918 Spanish flu or the 2009 swine flu.

== Types ==
=== Common source outbreak ===
In a common source outbreak epidemic, the affected individuals had an exposure to a common agent. If the exposure is singular and all of the affected individuals develop the disease over a single exposure and incubation course, it can be termed as a point source outbreak. If the exposure was continuous or variable, it can be termed as a continuous outbreak or intermittent outbreak, respectively.

=== Propagated outbreak ===
In a propagated outbreak, the disease spreads person-to-person. Affected individuals may become independent reservoirs leading to further exposures.Many epidemics will have characteristics of both common source and propagated outbreaks (sometimes referred to as mixed outbreak).

For example, secondary person-to-person spread may occur after a common source exposure or an environmental vector may spread a zoonotic diseases agent.

== Preparation ==
Preparations for an epidemic include having a disease surveillance system; the ability to quickly dispatch emergency workers, especially local-based emergency workers; and a legitimate way to guarantee the safety and health of health workers.

Effective preparations for a response to a pandemic are multi-layered. The first layer is a disease surveillance system. Tanzania, for example, runs a national lab that runs testing for 200 health sites and tracks the spread of infectious diseases. The next layer is the actual response to an emergency. According to U.S.-based columnist Michael Gerson in 2015, only the U.S. military and NATO have the global capability to respond to such an emergency. Still, despite the most extensive preparatory measures, a fast-spreading pandemic may easily exceed and overwhelm existing health-care resources. Consequently, early and aggressive mitigation efforts, aimed at the so-called "epidemic curve flattening" need to be taken. Such measures usually consist on non-pharmacological interventions such as social/physical distancing, aggressive contact tracing, "stay-at-home" orders, as well as appropriate personal protective equipment (i.e., masks, gloves, and other physical barriers to spread).

Moreover, India has taken significant strides in its efforts to prepare for future respiratory pandemics through the development of the National Pandemic Preparedness Plan for Respiratory Viruses using a multisectoral approach.

Preceding this national effort, a regional workshop on the Preparedness and Resilience for Emerging Threats (PRET) initiative was organized by WHO's South-East Asia Regional Office on October 12–13, 2023. Recognizing that the same capacities and capabilities can be leveraged and applied for groups of pathogens based on their mode of transmission, the workshop aimed to facilitate pandemic planning efficiency for countries in the region. The participating countries, in the aftermath of the workshop, outlined their immediate next steps and sought support from WHO and its partners to bolster regional preparedness against respiratory pathogen pandemics.

== See also ==
- List of epidemics
- Epidemiology
- Endemic (epidemiology)
- Pandemic
- Syndemic
- European Centre for Disease Prevention and Control
- Centers for Disease Control and Prevention
- Mathematical modelling of infectious disease
- Epidemic model
- Biosecurity
- Pathogen transmission
