= Trachoma elimination efforts in Nigeria =

Public health interventions in Nigeria

Trachoma is a chronic conjunctivitis caused by the bacteria Chlamydia trachomatis, that spread by flies, fomites and fingers in some part of the world where poor environmental and personal hygien exists. The chronic form of the disease leads to scarring of the tarsal plate and inversion of the upper lid margin (entropion) resulting in eyelashes rubbing the eyeball (trichiasis) eventually leading to blindness due corneal opafication. The World health Organization (WHO) in 1997 launched an ambitious plan to eliminate trachoma as a disease of public health significance by the year 2020 (Global Elimination of Trachoma by 2020 GET2020). Initially in 1996 WHO an elimination strategy for trachoma was adopted known as SAFE, an acronym which stand for

- Surgery for trachomatous trichiasis
- Antibiotics to clear C.trachomatis infection
- Facial cleanliness to reduce transmission of C.trachomatis
- Environmental improvement, especially easy access to clean water and sanitation

GET2020 is a partnership which support country implementation of SAFE strategy and strengthening of countries national capacities through resource mobilization, surveillance, epidemiological assessement and monitoring.

== Trachoma elimination effort in Nigeria ==
In Nigeria, trachoma elimination and mapping are conducted at Local Government Area (LGA) which is equivalent to EU's (Evaluation Unit) with a population of ranging from fewer than 100,000 to slightly over 250,000. Under federal coordination, local and state government partners with NGO's to implement the SAFE strategy.

=== Key milestones and timelines ===
2002: Trachoma elimination started with population based-prevalence survey in Plateau and Nasarawa state.

2003: Survey was expanded to other states like Kebbi, Sokoto Zamfara, which was later followed by Katsina, Kano, Yobe.

2012: The Global Trachoma Mapping Project (GTMP) began, mapping all LGA's with suspected endemic cases with exception of states restricted by security challenges.

2013: The federal ministry of health developed Nigeria's national trachoma action plan.

2017:Target year to complete the final antibiotic mass drug administration (MDA).

2018:Target year to achieve trachomatous trichiasis (TT) prevalence elimination threshold in every LGA and eliminate trachoma nationwide.

To implement the facial cleanliness (F) and environmental improvement (E) components of the SAFE strategy, the Federal Ministry of Health led collaborative efforts with the ministries of education, environment, and water resources.
