= Laying out =

Laying out might be used to describe:

- Marking out, the process of transferring a design or pattern to a workpiece
- Laying out the dead, also known as last offices
