= Distichia =

Eyelash growth from an abnormal part of the eyelid

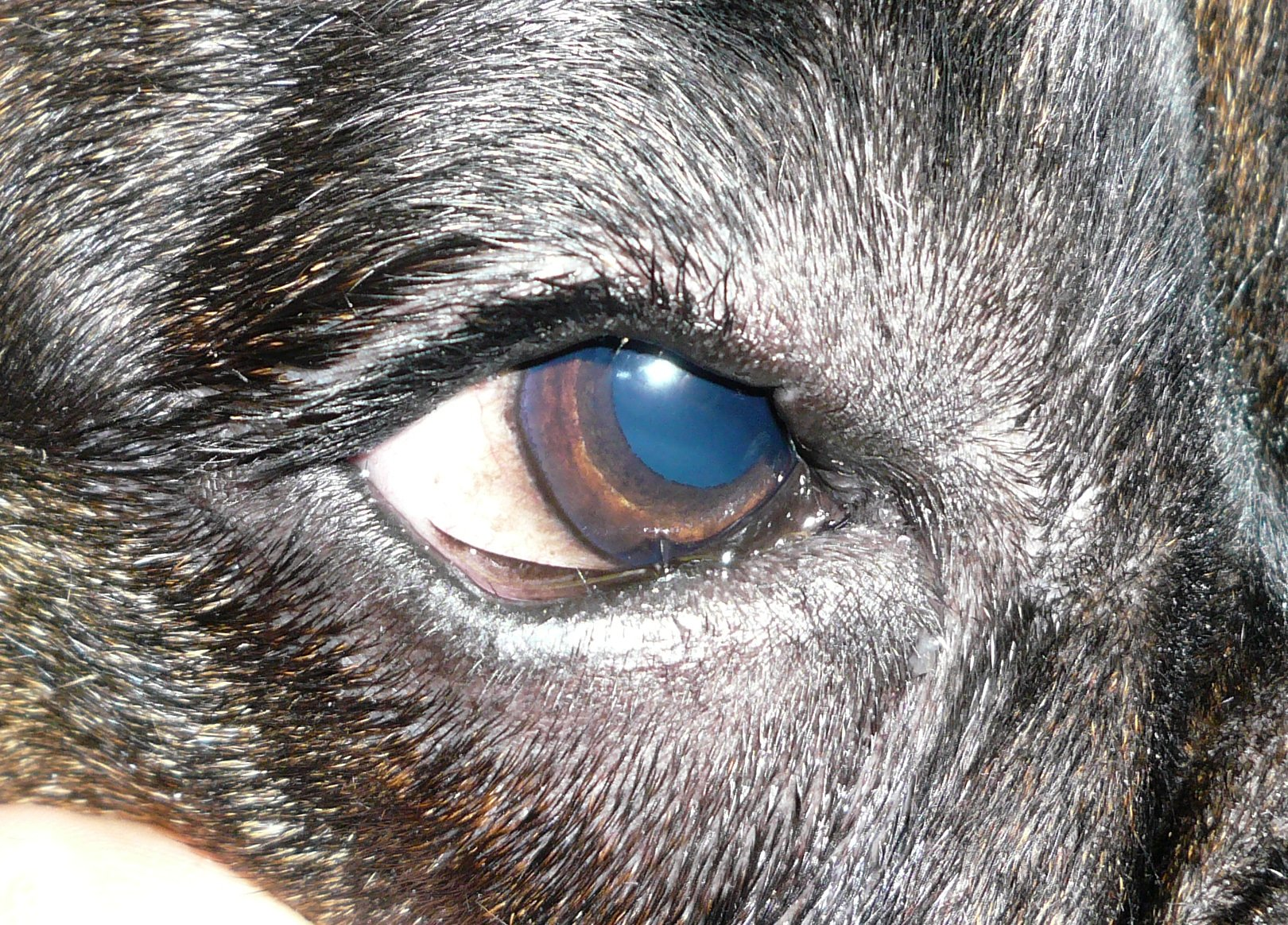
- Distichiae of the upper and lower lid of a dog
- Specialty: Ophthalmology

A distichia is when cilia (eyelashes) arise from the free lid margin. This abnormality, attributed to a genetic mutation, is a common opthalmological disorder of the dog. Distichiae usually exit from the duct of the meibomian gland at the eyelid margin. They are usually multiple, and sometimes more than one arises from a duct. They can affect either the upper or lower eyelid and are usually bilateral. The lower eyelids of dogs usually have no eyelashes.

Distichiae usually cause no symptoms, because the lashes are soft, but they can irritate the eye and cause tearing, squinting, inflammation, corneal ulcers and scarring. Treatment options include manual removal, electrolysis, electrocautery, cryotherapy, and surgery.

== Symptoms ==
When cilia grow into the cornea it can cause irritation and damage the cornea causing blepharospasm and lacrimation. Neovascularisation and ulceration can occur in severe cases.

== Treatment ==
Epilation is a temporary treatment that needs to be performed roughly every 4 to 5 weeks. The procedure does not require anaesthetic and can be performed by a non-veterinarian in some cases. Permanent treatment requires the hair follicle to be removed or destroyed, with the most common technique being cryosurgery. For surgery the eyelid is inverted using Von Graefe's forceps or a chalazion clamp to expose the affected follicles. For cryosurgery temperatures of −25°C are used, which destroys the follicle but not the rest of the tissue. Temperatures of −30°C or more will cause necrosis of the eyelid tissue. Depigmentation is a side effect of the procedure that typically resolves in 6 months but may be permanent. Scarring and distortion are also possible side effects of cryosurgery. Celsus–Hotz resection can be used when the entire eyelid is affected, but will cause mild entropion. Other methods of treatment include diathermy, electrolysis, partial tarsal plate excision, and transpalpebral conjunctival dissection

== Epidemiology ==
Some canine breeds are affected by distichiasis more frequently than others:

- Cocker Spaniel
- Dachshund (especially the miniature longhaired Dachshund)
- Bulldog
- Pekingese
- Yorkshire Terrier
- Flat-Coated Retriever
- Shetland Sheepdog
- Boxer
- Poodle

== Ectopic cilia ==
An ectopic cilia is a special type of distichia usually found in younger dogs. Commonly affected breeds include the Flat-Coated Retriever, Pekingese, Shih Tzu, Cavalier King Charles Spaniel, Boxer, English Bulldog, Poodle, and Jack Russell Terrier. The eyelash exits through the conjunctiva of the eyelid facing toward the eye, usually at the middle of the upper eyelid. It can cause intense pain and corneal ulcers. Treatment is surgery or cryotherapy.

== See also ==
- Trichiasis
- Lymphedema distichiasis
