= Monolids =

Human eyelid appearance

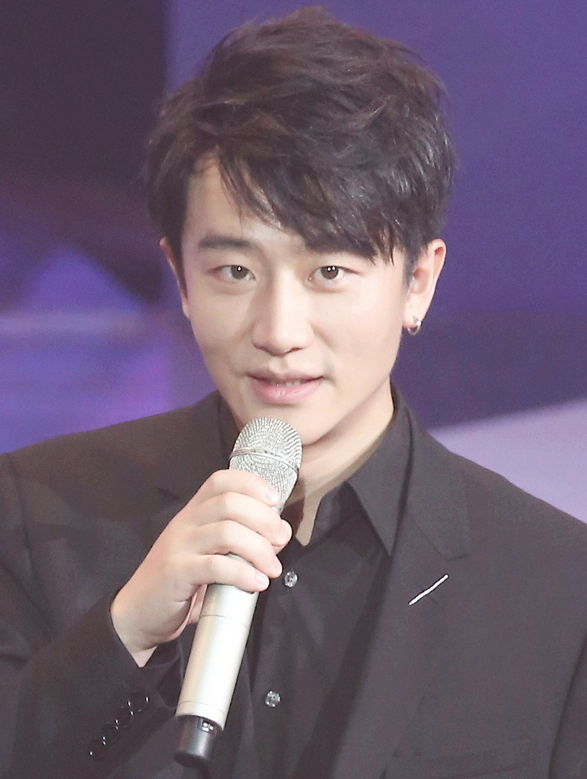
A photograph of Chinese Actor Huan Xuan, who has monolidded eyes

Monolids, also called single eyelids, are a type of eyelid without an upper eyelid crease. They are more common among the descendants of inhabitants of the Pacific Rim region (such as East Asians, Northeast Asian peoples, Indigenous peoples of the Americas, etc.).

== Genetics ==
Regarding the genetic mechanism of monolids, classical medical genetics has often regarded it as an autosomal recessive trait controlled by a single gene. In this model, double eyelids are usually considered to be controlled by a dominant gene (denoted as A), whereas monolids are controlled by a recessive gene (denoted as a); therefore, the genotype of an individual with monolids is regarded as homozygous recessive (aa). According to Mendel's laws of inheritance, if both parents have pure monolids (aa × aa), their children can theoretically inherit only the recessive gene, and their phenotype will usually also be monolids. This eyelid form is relatively common among East Asian populations; some studies have pointed out that the morphology of the upper eyelid in Asians differs significantly from that of other populations.

However, with the development of modern molecular biology, genome-wide association studies (GWAS) have shown that eyelid morphology is more likely to be a complex trait influenced by multiple genes, rather than a simple single-gene inheritance pattern. Research has found that the rs1415425 locus on chromosome 14 is significantly associated with the formation of double eyelids in East Asians. In addition, genetic variants near the BMP4 gene and the ABCC9 gene are also thought to be related to the depth and morphology of the eyelid crease. These studies help explain occasional atypical inheritance phenomena observed in reality, such as two single-eyelid parents having a child with double eyelids; such cases may be related to polygenic effects, differences in expressivity, misjudgement of the appearance of hidden double eyelids (Chinese: 内双), or the influence of environmental factors on phenotype.

== Cultural history ==
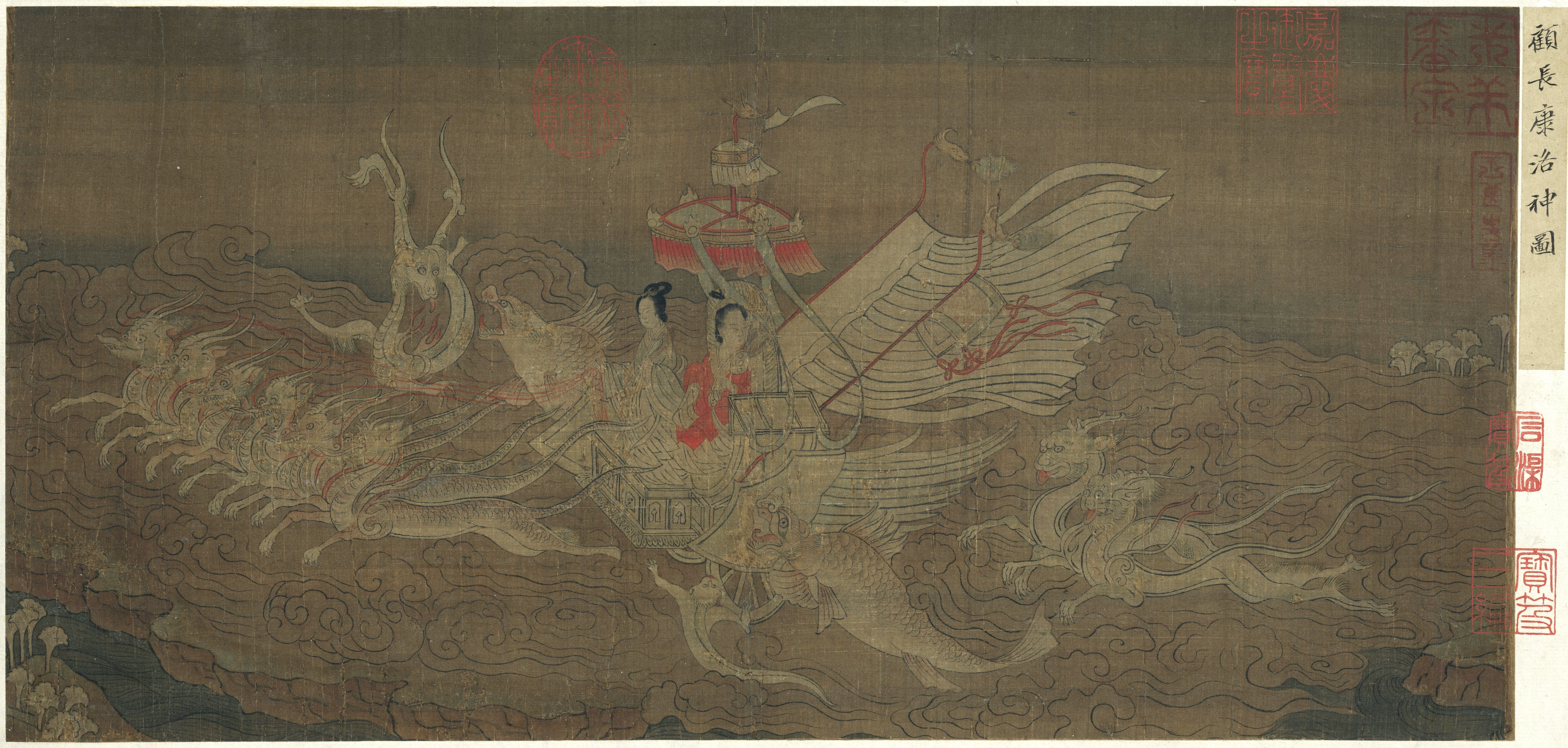
Illustrations of the Luo's Ode

In ancient East Asia, slender-eyed monolids long occupied the mainstream of beauty. For example, among the terracotta warriors of the Mausoleum of the Qin Emperor, more than eight thousand clay figures with different faces are, without exception, all monolidded. From the Eastern Jin painter Gu Kaizhi's Admonitions Scroll, to the court lady paintings (仕女畫) of the Tang dynasty painters Zhang Xuan and Zhou Fang, and then to figure portraits of the Ming and Qing dynasties, the figures in these paintings were almost all depicted with monolids. The mainstream beauties in Japanese ukiyo-e were likewise monolidded, such as Kitagawa Utamaro's Three Beauties of the Kansei Era.

== See also ==
- Human Eyelids
- Double eyelids
- East Asian blepharoplasty
