= Entropion =

Inward folding of the eyelid

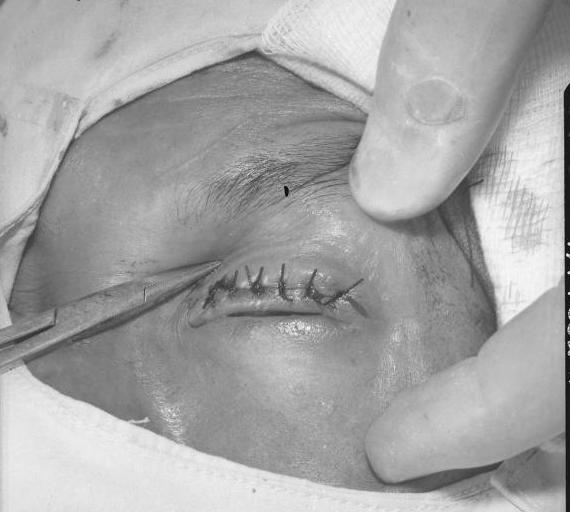
- Entropion and trichiasis secondary to trachoma
- Specialty: Medical genetics

Entropion is a medical condition in which the eyelid (usually the lower lid) folds inward. It is very uncomfortable, as the eyelashes continuously rub against the cornea causing irritation. Entropion is usually caused by genetic factors. This is different from when an extra fold of skin on the lower eyelid causes lashes to turn in towards the eye (epiblepharon). In epiblepharons, the eyelid margin itself is in the correct position, but the extra fold of skin causes the lashes to be misdirected. Entropion can also create secondary pain of the eye (leading to self trauma, scarring of the eyelid, or nerve damage). The upper or lower eyelid can be involved, and one or both eyes may be affected. When entropion occurs in both eyes, this is known as "bilateral entropion". Repeated cases of trachoma infection may cause scarring of the inner eyelid, which may cause entropion. In human cases, this condition is most common to people over 60 years of age.

== Symptoms and signs ==
Symptoms of entropion include:

- Redness and pain around the eye
- Sensitivity to light and wind
- Sagging skin around the eye
- Eye watering
- Decreased vision, especially if the cornea is damaged

== Causes ==
The following are the causes:

- Congenital
- Aging creating loose skin and stretched and loose ligaments and muscles (senile entropion).
- Scarring (mechanical entropion)
- Spasm
- An eye infection called trachoma is still common in North Africa and South Asia and this can cause scarring of the inner eyelid, which may cause friction and entropion.

== Treatment ==
Treatment is a relatively simple surgery in which excess skin of the outer lids is removed or tendons and muscles are shortened with one or two stitches. General anesthesia is sometimes used before local anesthetics are injected into the muscles around the eye. Prognosis is excellent if surgery is performed before the cornea is damaged.

== Entropion in other species ==
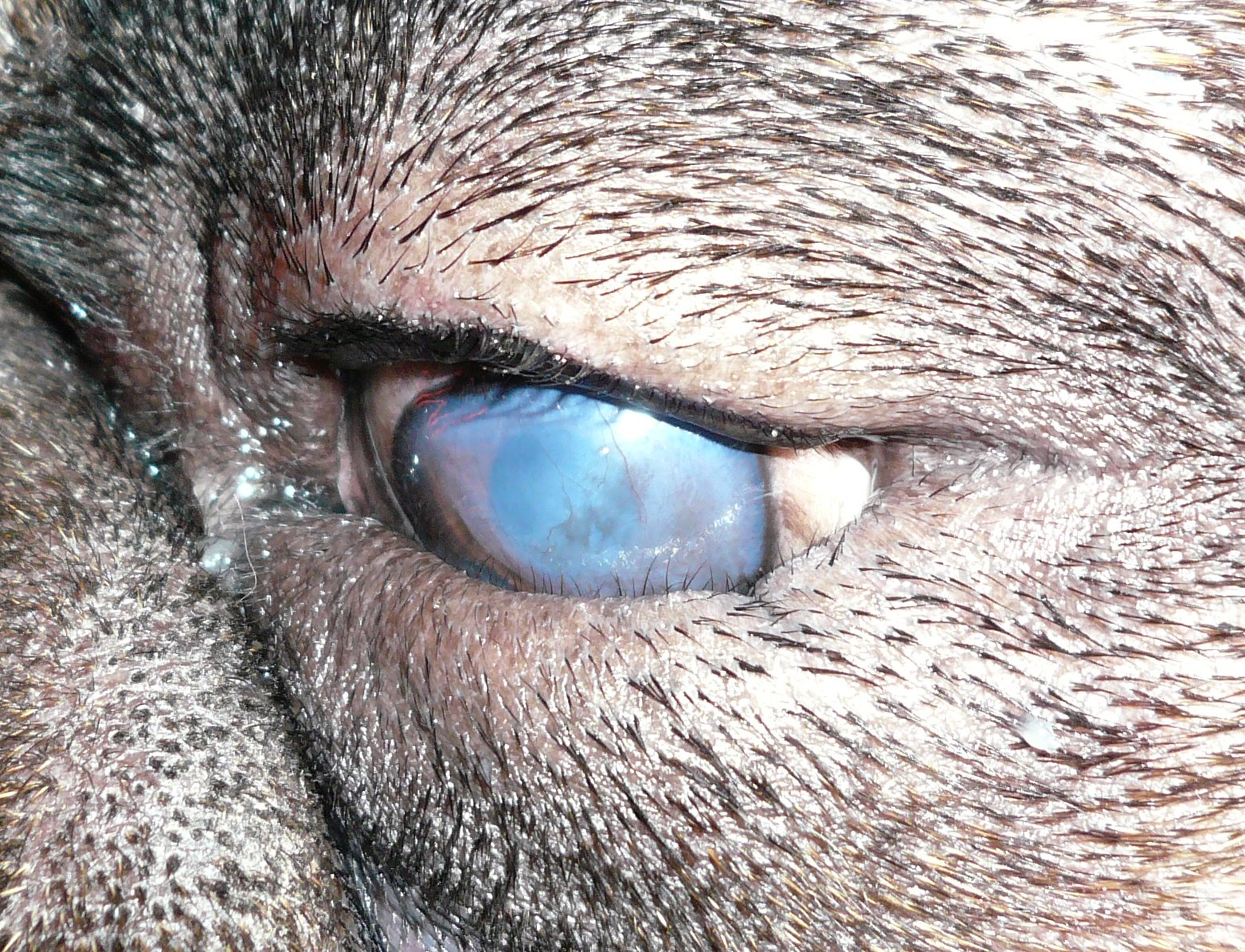
Canine entropion

Entropion has been documented in most dog breeds, although there are some breeds (particularly purebreds) that are more commonly affected than others. These include the Akita, Pug, Chow Chow, Shar Pei, St. Bernard, Cocker Spaniel, Boxer, English Springer Spaniel, Welsh Springer Spaniel, Labrador Retriever, Cavalier King Charles Spaniel, Neapolitan Mastiff, Bull Mastiff, Great Dane, Irish Setter, Shiba Inu, Rottweiler, Poodle and particularly Bloodhound. The condition is usually present by six months of age. If left untreated, the condition can cause such trauma to the eye that it will require removal.

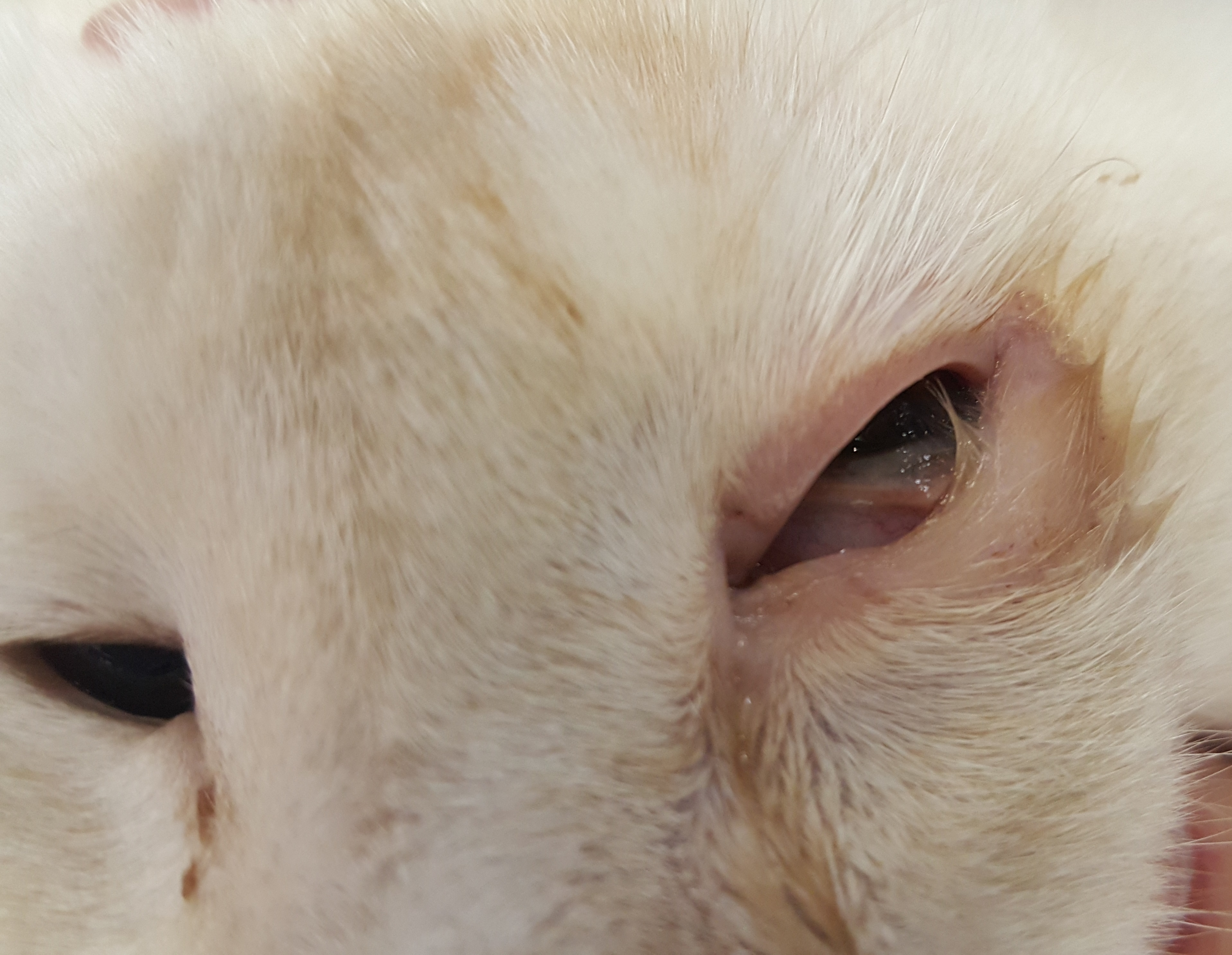
Feline entropion

Entropion has also been seen in cat breeds. Typically it is secondary to trauma or infection leading to chronic eyelid changes. It is also seen secondary to enophthalmos. Primary entropion might also be encountered: the brachycephalic breeds (mostly the Persian) and the Maine Coon are predisposed.

Upper-lid entropion involves the eyelashes rubbing on the eye, but the lower lid usually has no eyelashes, so little or no hair rubs on the eye. Surgical correction is used in more severe cases. A number of techniques for surgical correction exist. The Hotz-Celsus technique involves the removal of strip of skin and orbicularis oculi muscle parallel to the affected portion of the lid and then the skin is sutured.

Alternative techniques such as the Wyman technique focus on tightening the lower eyelid. This technique is not as effective in cases of enophthalmos. Shar Peis, who often are affected as young as two or three weeks old, respond well to temporary eyelid tacking. The entropion is often corrected after three to four weeks, and the sutures are removed.

== See also ==
- Ectropion
