= Sulcus subtarsalis =

Groove inside the eyelid

Sulcus subtarsalis is a groove in the inner surface of eyelid near the eyelid margin and which is also parallel to it. This separates marginal conjunctiva from tarsal conjunctiva. It provides space for lodging of foreign bodies. Arlt's line is a linear line present in the sulcus subtarsalis in Chlamydia trachomatis infection.
