= Charles Michel (ophthalmologist) =

American ophthalmologist (1832–1913)

Charles Michel (1832–1913) was an American ophthalmologist best known for publishing the first clinical report of successful electrology in 1875.

== Early life and education ==
Michel was born in Charleston, South Carolina. He received an M.D. degree at the Medical College of the State of South Carolina (now known as Medical University of South Carolina) in 1857. During the Civil War he served in the Confederate States Army as a surgeon and medical inspector.

== Career ==
After the war and until his death, Michel spent practicing ophthalmology in St. Louis, Missouri. He became a Professor of Ophthalmology at Washington University School of Medicine (previously Missouri Medical College) and a surgeon and ophthalmic surgeon at Eye, Ear, Nose, and Throat Infirmary and at Martha Parsons Hospital for Children respectively, in St. Louis, Missouri.

== Achievements ==
Michel was practicing in St. Louis, Missouri, when he began using a battery-powered needle epilator to treat trichiasis (ingrown eyelashes) in 1869. This direct current–powered method was called electrolysis because a chemical reaction in the hair follicle causes sodium hydroxide to form, which damages the follicle. Electrolysis is also sometimes called galvanic electrolysis.
