= Arthur Hinkel =

American electrical engineer

Arthur Ralph Hinkel
- Born: January 9, 1916
- Died: January 17, 1993 (aged 77)
- Occupation: Electrical engineer

Arthur Ralph Hinkel (January 9, 1916 – January 17, 1993) was an American electrical engineer best known for developing the Blend Method of electrology.

Hinkel met electrologist Henri St. Pierre in the 1930s while Hinkel worked at the medical division of General Electric. They began work on developing an epilator that combined electrolysis and thermolysis. In 1948, the St. Pierre Epilator Company Inc., owned by St. Pierre and Hinkel, received a patent for a blended current epilator.

Hinkel also owned a chain of electrology businesses. He sold the manufacturing portion of the business in 1984, which still operates under the name A.R. Hinkel.

== Bibliography ==
- Hinkel AR, Lind RW (1968). Electrolysis, Thermolysis and the Blend: the principles and practice of permanent hair removal.Los Angeles, CA: Arroway Publishers, ISBN 0-9600284-1-2
