= Epiblepharon =

Birth defect; extra fold of eyelid skin which turns the eyelashes inward onto the eye

Epiblepharon is a condition characterised by a congenital horizontal fold of skin near the margin of the upper or lower eyelid caused by the abnormal insertion of muscle fibres. This extra fold of skin redirects the lashes into a vertical position, where they may contact the globe of the eye, affecting the cornea or the conjunctiva. This is found most commonly in Asian individuals, especially children. One estimate puts the percentage of affected Asian children aged 7–14 years old at 12.6%.
