= Arlt's line =

- Specialty: Ophthalmology
- Causes: Chlamydia trachomatis
- Differential diagnosis: Trachoma

Arlt's line is a thick band of scar tissue in the conjunctiva of the eye, near the lid margin, that is associated with eye infections. Arlt's line is a characteristic finding of trachoma, an infection of the eye caused by Chlamydia trachomatis. The line runs horizontally, parallel to eyelid, and is found at the junction of the anterior one third and posterior two thirds of the conjunctiva.The line is named after the Austrian ophthalmologist Carl Ferdinand von Arlt.
