= East Asian blepharoplasty =

Cosmetic surgery for creating an eyelid crease

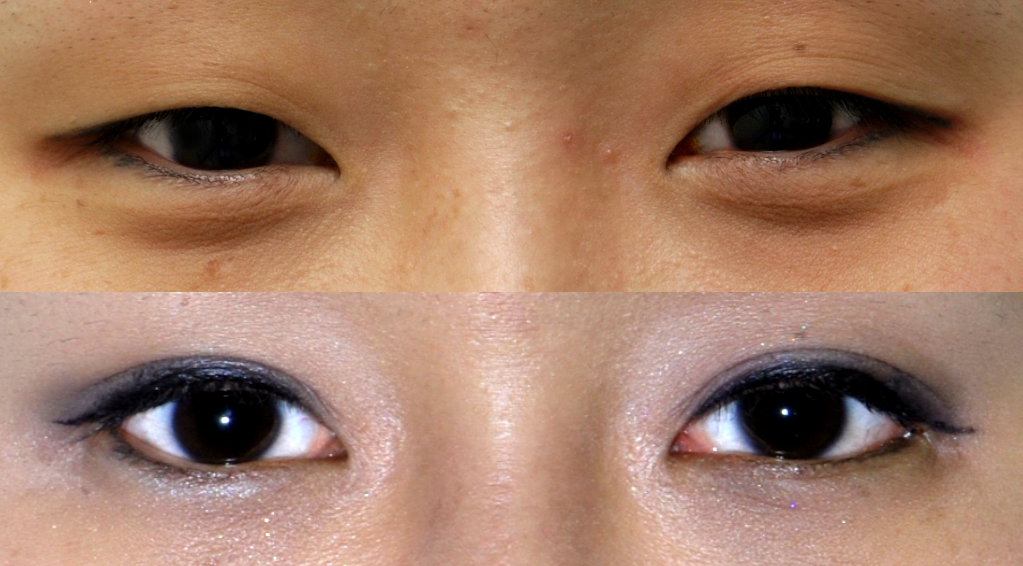
- A South Korean woman, before (above) and after (below) undergoing East Asian blepharoplasty
- ICD-9-CM: 08

East Asian blepharoplasty, more commonly known as double eyelid surgery, is a cosmetic procedure that reshapes the skin around the eye to create a crease in an upper eyelid that naturally lacks one. The percentage of East Asian women who naturally have upper eyelid creases varies among studies, with reported amounts ranging from 41% in Koreans to 70-83% in Chinese and Japanese. This surgery may be performed on ethnic East Asians, including people of Chinese, Japanese and Korean descent. The primary goal is to alter the eyelid's appearance, making the eyes appear larger and, to some tastes, more attractive due to a "wide-eyed" and expressive appearance.

== Historical context ==
The procedure was first performed in 1896 by Dr. Kotaro Mikamo in Japan, a period marked by significant Western influence following the Meiji Restoration. Mikamo's introduction of the surgery has been interpreted in different ways. Although the majority of Japanese women naturally have double eyelids, one perspective sometimes held by Westerners is that the procedure was intended to "westernize" the eyes of Japanese women, influenced by Western beauty standards that were purportedly becoming increasingly prevalent in Japan during the Meiji period.

However, Mikamo recorded that the 82-83% of Japanese women actually have the double eyelid appearance, making it a physiologically normative feature among the population. He described the single-eyelid look as being "monotonous and expressionless," suggesting that his motivation for the surgery was rooted in enhancing natural beauty rather than conforming to Western ideals. According to this perspective, Mikamo was working within existing Japanese aesthetics and norms, aiming to accentuate a feature that was already prevalent and culturally appreciated in Japan.

== Surgical techniques ==
Asian blepharoplasty is primarily performed using two techniques: non-incisional and incisional methods. The most notable difference from upper blepharoplasty performed in Caucasians is that the position of the double fold must be fixed with suture material in Asian patients . In Western patients, simply excising redundant or sagging skin is often sufficient to create an eyelid crease. In contrast, in Asian blepharoplasty, fold formation sutures utilizing the septoaponeurotic junctional thickening are essential. A lack of understanding of this anatomical distinction may lead to unsatisfactory surgical outcomes.

=== Non-incisional technique (suture ligation) ===
The non-incisional method, or suture ligation, involves the strategic placement of sutures through all layers of the upper eyelid at the level of the upper tarsal margin. This technique facilitates adhesion between the subdermal tissues and the underlying levator aponeurosis, effectively creating the eyelid crease. It is less complex and has a shorter operation time, leading to a quicker recovery and fewer complications compared to more invasive methods. However, it tends to produce a static eyelid crease that does not vary with facial expressions and may diminish over time. Additionally, the underlying sutures can sometimes lead to corneal irritation.

=== Incisional technique (surgical resection) ===
The incisional method, known as surgical resection, entails making an incision across the upper eyelid to remove excessive tissue, including skin, subcutaneous fat, orbicularis oculi muscle, and other anatomical components. This approach not only allows for the creation of a more dynamic and permanent eyelid crease but also can address other aesthetic concerns by removing excess skin and fat. The results are more aligned with the natural anatomy of the eye, making the crease appear more natural and dynamic. However, this method is more complex, requiring a longer operation and recovery time. One significant risk is lagophthalmos, where excessive removal of lid tissue can prevent the eyelid from fully closing.

Each of these techniques offers distinct advantages and poses specific challenges, making the choice between them dependent on individual anatomical and aesthetic considerations.

== Modern trends ==
East Asian blepharoplasty have been reported to be the most common aesthetic procedure in Taiwan, South Korea and other parts of East Asia and is also frequently performed in Northeast Indian states such as Assam. The procedure has been reported to have some risk of complications, but is generally quite safe if done by an expert plastic surgeon. Practitioners of East Asian blepharoplasty include plastic surgeons (facial plastic and reconstructive surgeons), otolaryngologists, oral and maxillofacial surgeons, and ophthalmologists (oculoplastic surgeons). A procedure to remove the epicanthal fold (i.e., an epicanthoplasty) is often performed in conjunction with an East Asian blepharoplasty.

== See also ==
- Epicanthoplasty
- Blepharoplasty
- Cosmetic surgery
