= Last offices =

Procedures carried out after a person dies

The last offices, or laying out, is the procedures performed, usually by a nurse, to the body of a dead person shortly after death has been confirmed. They can vary between hospitals and between cultures.

== Name ==
The word "offices" is related to the original Latin, in which officium means "service, duty, business". Hence these are the "last duties" carried out on the body.

== Reasons ==
Last offices may be done in order to prepare the deceased for a mortuary, respecting their cultural beliefs, or to comply with legislation, in particular where the death of a patient requires the involvement of a procurator fiscal or coroner. Additionally, they are done to minimise any risk of infection to relatives, health care workers, or any other persons who may need to handle the deceased.

== Procedure ==
Often the body of the deceased is left for up to an hour as a mark of respect. The procedure then typically includes the following steps, though they can vary according to an institution's preferred practices:

- Removal of jewellery unless requested otherwise by the deceased's family. If left on it must be documented in the patient's property list.
- Wounds, including pressure sores, should be covered with a waterproof dressing. Tube insertion points should be padded with gauze and tape to avoid purging.
- The patient is laid on their back with arms by their side (unless religious customs demand otherwise). Eyelids are closed.
- The jaw is often supported with a pillow or cervical collar.
- Dentures should be left in place, unless inappropriate.
- The bladder is drained by applying pressure on the lower abdomen. Orifices are blocked only if leakage of body fluid is evident.
- The body is then washed and dried, the mouth cleaned and the face shaved.
- An identification bracelet is put on the ankle detailing: the name of the patient; date of birth; date and time of death; name of ward (if patient died in hospital); patient identification number.
- The body is dressed in a simple garment or wrapped in a shroud. An identification label duplicating the above information is pinned to the wrap or shroud.
- A stretcher drawsheet is placed under the body to enable removal to a trolley for transportation to the morgue. These trolleys may often be disguised to resemble laundry carts if transportation has to pass through areas where members of the public may be present.

== Bathing the dead ==
Washing the body of a dead person, sometimes as part of a religious ritual, is a customary funerary practice in several cultures. It was delegated to professionals in ancient Egypt and ancient Rome, and by well-off Victorians, and is now in Western societies, but was traditionally performed by "family, friends, and neighbors."

=== Judaism ===
It is part of traditional Jewish burial rites.

During the Inquisition in Spain, bodies undergoing preparation for burial were sometimes scrutinized for signs that they had been washed, since this was seen as a marker of secret Jewish practice (crypto-Judaism).

=== Buddhism and Hinduism ===
Bathing of the dead, known as yukan, is also found in Buddhism. It is also found in Hinduism.

=== Islam ===
It is a religious practice in Islam, where the body is washed by members of the dead person's family. When possible, three washings are performed: first with water infused with plum leaves, then with water infused with camphor, and lastly with purified water.

The washing is usually performed by others of the same gender, although Islamic Hausa people permit spouses to wash each other's bodies.

=== Africa ===
Funerary bathing is performed in traditional funerals in some countries in West Africa. The ritual washing of the dead is believed to be one of the factors which resulted in the rapid spread of Ebola virus in Guinea, Liberia and Sierra Leone in 2014.

In Algerian religious tradition, a Ĝassâla, or Washer of the Dead is a woman who assists with death purification rites.

=== Cultural references ===
Antigone speaks of washing the dead in accordance with the Greek custom, although she was limited to pouring water on the body of her brother Polyneikes.

The custom of bathing the dead has been depicted in a number of films. In the 1995 film Braveheart, a young William Wallace watches as women bathe the bodies of his father and brother, who were killed in battle against English troops during the 13th century. The 2009 film The White Ribbon depicts the washing of a deceased housewife in a Northern German village just before World War I. In the film A Midnight Clear (1992), set in the Battle of the Ardennes in World War II, a small group of soldiers are able to take a brief respite from the war when they procure a bath tub and heat up some water. After all have bathed, they wash the body of a comrade who was recently killed while trying to help a unit of German soldiers.

An episode of the HBO series Six Feet Under shows Nate Fisher's body being "slowly and methodically" washed by his mother and brother.

== See also ==
- Ritual purification
- Death and culture
- Islamic funeral
- Antyesti
