= Epicanthoplasty =

Eyelid surgery

- ICD-9-CM: 08

Epicanthoplasty is a rare eye surgery to modify the epicanthal folds. It can be a challenging procedure because the epicanthal folds overlay the lacrimal canaliculi (tear drainage canals). Although an epicanthic fold can also be associated with a less prominent upper eyelid crease (a feature commonly termed "single eyelids" as opposed to "double eyelids"), the two features are distinct; a person may have both epicanthal folds and an upper eyelid crease, one and not the other, or neither. Single eyelids are reshaped using East Asian blepharoplasty.

Epicanthoplasty may leave visible post-surgical scar lines. A common corrective technique involves using Z-plasty.

== See also ==
- East Asian blepharoplasty – Cosmetic surgery for creating an eyelid crease
- Blepharoplasty – Surgical modification of the eyelids
- Cosmetic surgery – Medical surgical specialty
