= Electrology =

Method of hair removal

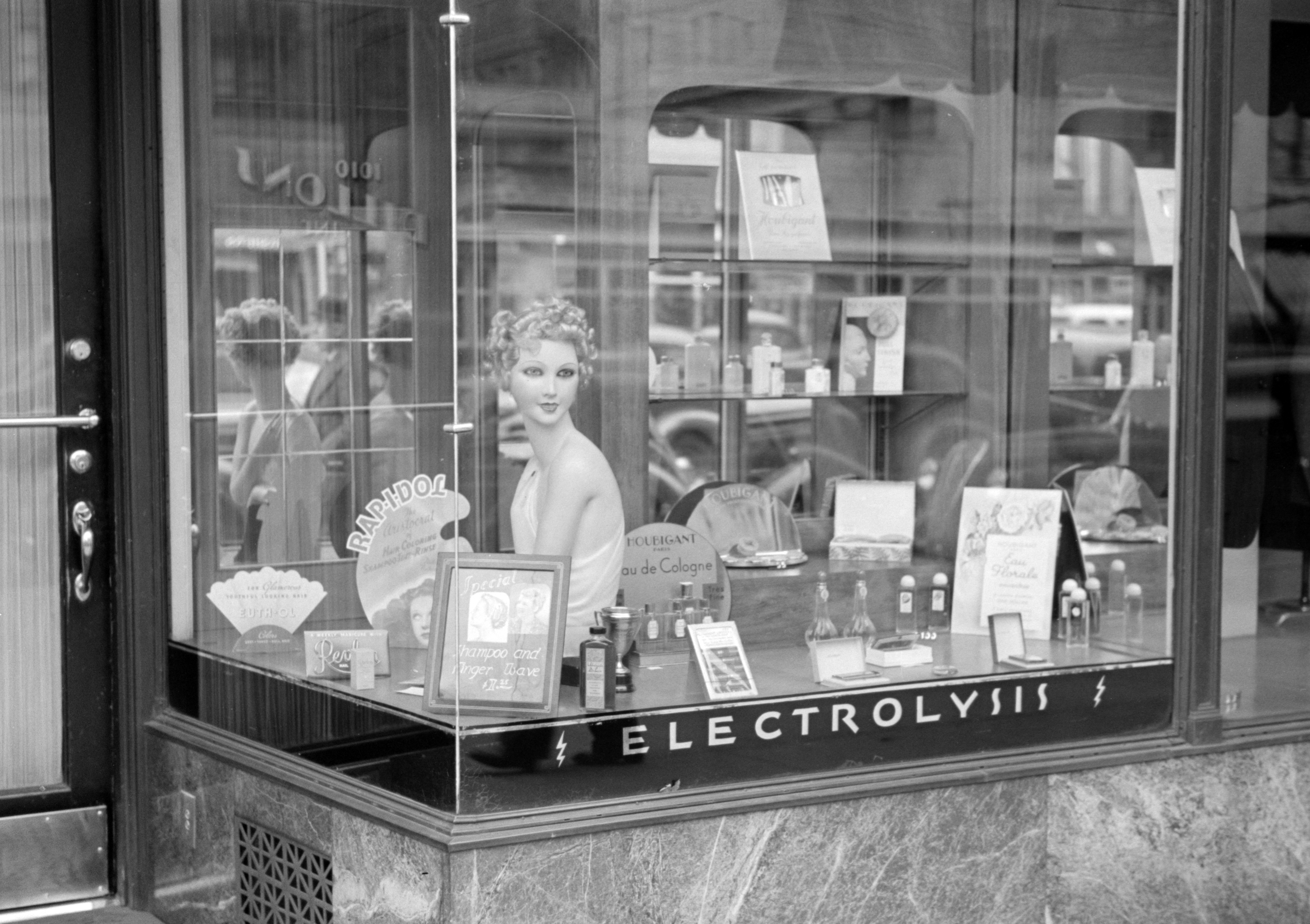
A beauty store advertising electrolysis hair removal, circa 1938

Electrology is the science and professional practice of permanent hair removal by electrolysis.

An electrologist is a practitioner of electrology who performs electrolysis. During the procedure, a hair-thin metal filament is inserted into the natural opening of each hair follicle and a controlled electrical current is applied. The current destroys the cells responsible for hair growth through either chemical action (galvanic), heat (thermolysis), or a combination of both (blend).

== Modalities ==
All three modalities (galvanic, thermolysis, and blend) have their own merits, and one method is not better than another. The success depends on the skill of the electrologist, the type of hair being removed, the condition of the skin and the pain threshold of the client. All three methods, when properly performed, can be thorough at destroying the hair matrix cells, and leaving follicles incapable of regrowing hair.

=== Galvanic ===
This method is named after Luigi Galvani and uses a person's body as an electrolytic cell. Galvanic electrolysis was first reported in medical literature in 1875 by ophthalmologist Charles Michel as a method for removing ingrown eyelashes. A galvanic hair remover is essentially a positive ground power supply that delivers 0–3 milliamperes through the body. The follicular probe is the cathode of an electrolytic cell. Sodium hydroxide formed at the cathode by the process of chemical electrolysis kills the hair matrix cells. Modern galvanic hair removers automatically adjust the voltage to maintain constant current.

=== Thermolysis ===
Another method is known as thermolysis, also called radio frequency (RF), shortwave or diathermy. Thermolysis was developed in the 1920s and first reported in medical literature by Henri Bordier. A thermolytic hair remover is essentially a radio transmitter, usually with an output of about 0–8 watts at a frequency of 13.56 MHz. RF energy emanates from the probe tip to tissue within about a millimeter. Thermolysis works by heating the hair matrix cells to about 48 to 50 °C (118 to 122 °F), causing electrocoagulation.

=== Blend method ===
The galvanic method and thermolysis are often combined in the blend method, developed by Arthur Hinkel in 1948, which uses both RF and direct current, combining many of the advantages of both methods.

== Technique ==
The practitioner selects a metal probe that slides easily into the hair follicle, usually the same diameter as the hair shaft or smaller. The probe is typically 50 to 150 μm (0.002 to 0.006 inches) for all three modalities. Care is needed to insert the probe at the same angle as the hair is growing out of the skin. The probe is inserted to the depth of the hair matrix, the site where hair is formed. The power and duration of the electricity are started at the lowest setting, then gradually increased until the hair comes out as easily as possible. If the patient experiences significant discomfort, the settings can be lowered.

== Status of the profession ==
In the United States, electrolysis is regulated in many states, requiring training and licensing.

Electrolysis as a profession faced new competition in the 1990s after laser hair removal was developed and promoted as a quicker and easier way to remove hair. However, the U.S. Food and Drug Administration (FDA) declared laser can only claim to reduce hair growth, not permanently remove it.

== See also ==
- Hair removal
  - Laser hair removal
- Intense pulsed light (skin treatment technology)
