= Trichiasis =

Abnormally positioned eyelashes that grow back toward the eye

- Specialty: Ophthalmology
- Diagnostic method: Slit lamp

Trichiasis (/trɪkiˈeɪsɪs/ trik-ee-AY-sis, /trɪˈkaɪəsɪs/ tri-KEYE-ə-sis) is a medical term for abnormally positioned eyelashes that grow back toward the eye, touching the cornea or conjunctiva. This can be caused by infection, inflammation, autoimmune conditions, congenital defects, eyelid agenesis and trauma such as burns or eyelid injury.

Standard treatment involves removal or destruction of the affected eyelashes with electrology, specialized laser, or surgery. In many cases, removal of the affected eyelashes with forceps resolves the symptoms, although the problem often recurs in a few weeks when the eyelashes regrow. Severe cases may cause scarring of the cornea and lead to vision loss if untreated. Mild cases may not require treatment.

Repeated cases of trachoma infection may cause trichiasis.

Posterior misdirection of normal lashes most frequently affects the lower lid.

== In dogs ==
Trichiasis in dogs is hair from the eyelid growing in the wrong direction and rubbing on the eye, causing irritation. It usually occurs at the lateral upper eyelid, especially in the English Cocker Spaniel. Trichiasis also refers to hair from a nasal fold rubbing on the eye. This type of trichiasis can be flattened by rubbing petroleum jelly onto it, but surgery is sometimes necessary for permanent correction.

== Complications ==
- Inferior punctate epitheliopathy
- Corneal ulceration
- Pannus

== See also ==
- Distichiasis
- Madarosis
- Trachoma
