= 2021 Idar-Oberstein shooting =

2021 shooting in Germany

On September 18, 2021, a fatal attack with a firearm on the 20-year-old employee of a gas station was carried out in Idar-Oberstein, Germany. The perpetrator, a 49-year-old man, had been requested by the employee to wear his surgical mask as mandated by the German government in response to the COVID-19 pandemic. The shooting received a lot of public attention and was related by some to the increasing radicalization of the so-called Querdenken movement or to the recent rise of right-wing conspiracy theories, while criminal psychologists pointed to the possibility that the shooter may have been driven by personal or psychological problems. In September 2022, the perpetrator was convicted of murder and sentenced to life in jail; both prosecution and defence lodged appeals against the verdict.

== Attack ==
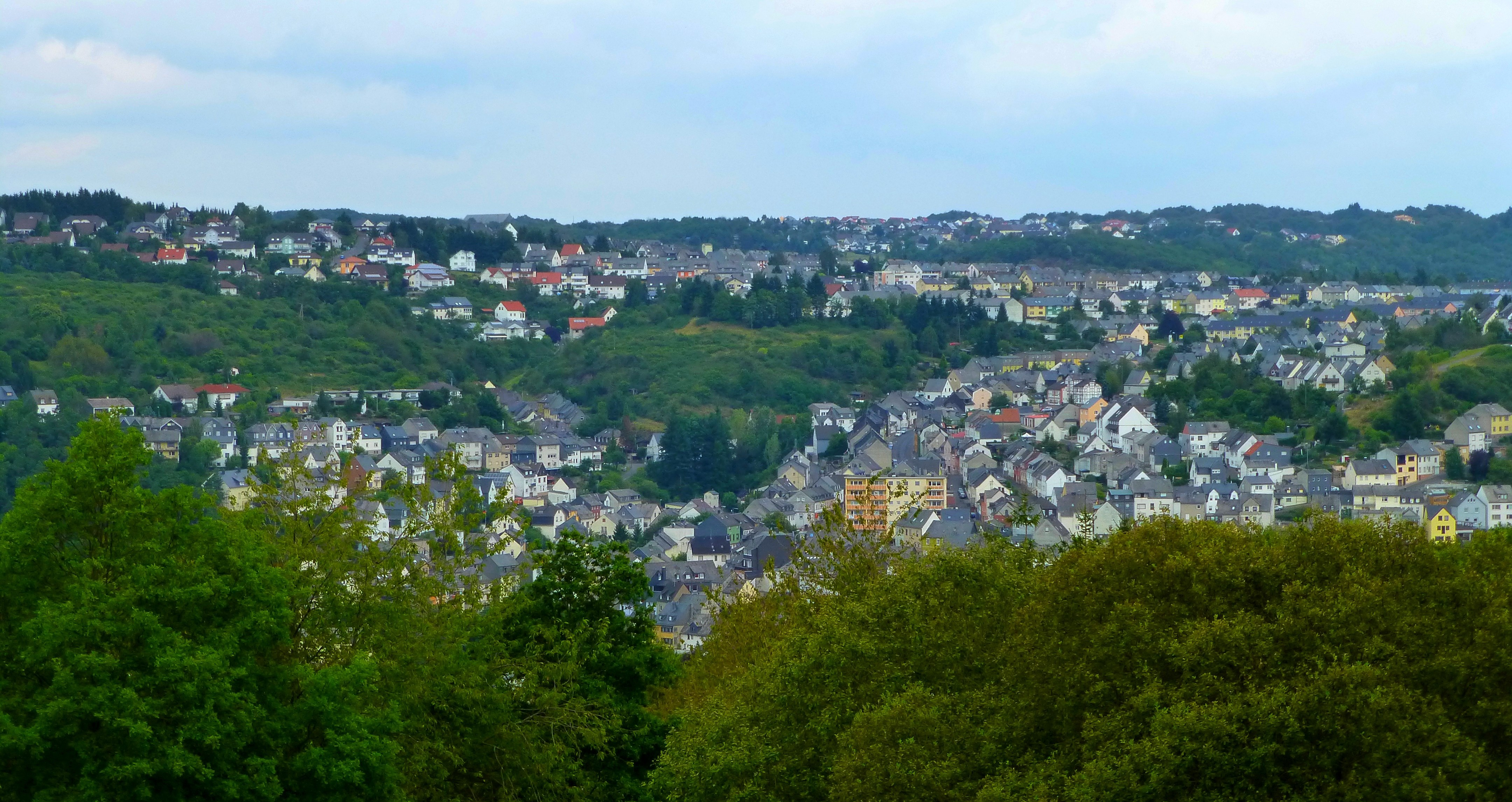
Idar-Oberstein, a town in the West of Germany Photo 2012

On Saturday evening, September 18, 2021, the 20-year-old victim was working at an Aral gas station (BP) in Idar-Oberstein. At 7:42 p.m. the suspect entered the store to buy two six-packs of beer. However, the employee refused to sell him the beer, and twice referred to the mask requirement. Recordings from the CCTV showed a mask in the back pocket of the alleged murderer. Instead of putting it on, he bumped his hands against the beer packs in anger and threatened the employee with his left fist as he left the store.

At about 9:30 p.m. the man returned to the gas station. He was now wearing a mask and in the meantime had also exchanged his previously white T-shirt for a black one. At the counter, he pulled down the mask and thus provoked the argument again. Then he pulled out a gun and shot the employee in the head. The victim fell to ground and was instantly dead. The shooter fled on foot.

== Victim ==
The victim of the murder was 20-year-old student Alexander W., who had a job at the gas station. He worked at the store in order to earn money to get his driver's license.

== Perpetrator ==
Police arrested 49-year-old software developer Mario N. from Idar-Oberstein, who by September 22 confessed to the killing. He had not drawn police attention before and was also not known to the Office for the Protection of the Constitution (German domestic intelligence agency).

For years, Mario N. was active in right-wing social networks. He was active in Telegram and according to research by Der Spiegel and the think tank CeMAS, had already been noticed in 2020 for nebulous fantasies of violence. On social media, he said he was a disappointed CDU voter. He mainly followed accounts of the right-wing AfD and people belonging to it, but also the CDU candidate for the Bundestag and former head of the constitutional protection Hans-Georg Maaßen. He "shared right-wing channels, commented on Trump, believes that climate change is a lie," according to CeMAS. He welcomed what he thought was an imminent war. Literally he wrote in September 2019 on Twitter: "I'm looking forward to the next war. Yes, that may sound destructive now, but we just can't get out of this spiral." In his last tweet on the profile from October 2020, he wrote: "My muscles are tense, my mind sharpened. Grace to those who created this situation. Or no, mercy would be wrong."

N. not only stored the alleged murder weapon, but also other firearms and ammunition with him. The police pointed out that he did not legally own any of the weapons as N. has no gun license and is not a marksman. It is unclear where the weapon came from.

On October 4, it became known that N. had told police that he had consumed several beers before the shooting. To which degree this may have affected the shooter was the subject of investigation. A blood alcohol test taken twelve hours after the shooting had only yielded minor traces of alcohol.

In November 2021, police said that the evaluation of seized data carriers owned by N. had shown "that he had been distant from the majority of society and the state," a prosecutor said. And this would not only apply to the Corona issue. N said, he would get his informations not "from established media, only from the free media" and was referring to groups from the messenger Telegram, among other things.

In September 2022, the court convicted N. of murder and sentenced him to life in jail, while not following the request of the prosecution and joint plaintiff to determine a "particular seriousness of guilt" (besondere Schwere der Schuld), a concept in German law which determines whether the convicted can be released on parole after having served 15 years in jail. The defence lawyer of N. had argued for the lesser crime of homicide, and pointed to the intoxicated state of N. at the time of the shooting as mitigating circumstance. Also in September, both prosecution and defence lodged appeals against the verdict, leading to the case to be escalated to the Federal Court of Justice.

== Motive and classification ==
The allegedly politically motivated killing received international attention and drew attention to the increasingly radicalizing scene of those in Germany, who reject the state monopoly of force due to the corona protective measures and cultivate subversion fantasies. Criminal psychologists pointed to the possibility that the shooter may have been driven by personal or psychological problems.

After his arrest, Mario N. justified the act with frustration at the pandemic and the rules for protection against COVID infections. He felt pushed into a corner and "saw no other way out" than to set an example, said Chief Public Prosecutor Kai Fuhrmann. For the suspect, the victim is "responsible for the overall situation because he had enforced the rules".

Investigators reported that Mario N. was "well versed" in the theories of the corona deniers. The police evaluate seized electronic devices.

== Reactions ==
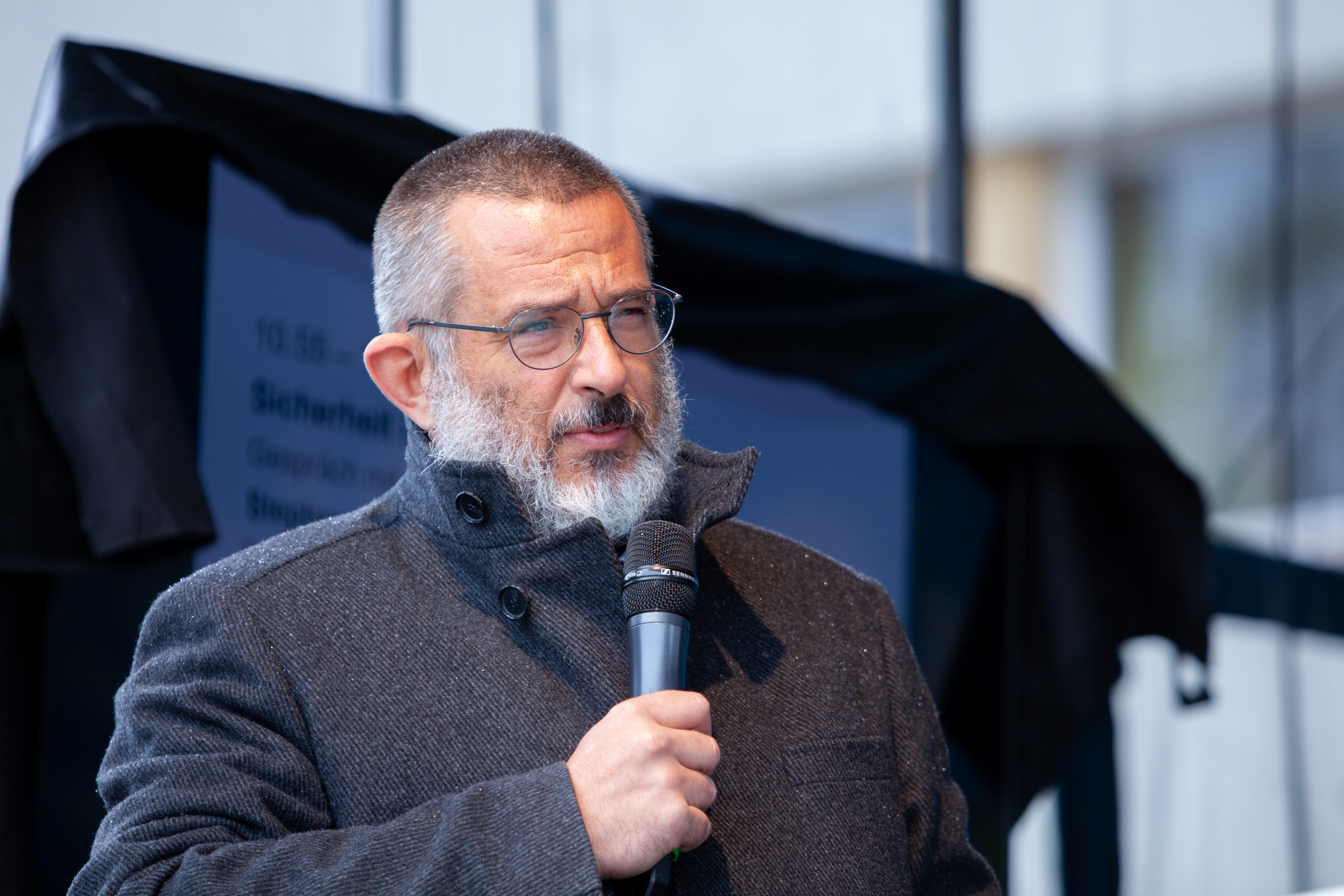
Stephan Kramer, President of the Thuringian Office for the Protection of the Constitution, said two days after the killing, "the murder wasn't surprising".

The Federal Ministry of the Interior of Horst Seehofer (CSU) assessed the act in Idar-Oberstein as an "extreme isolated case". It shows "a dramatic degree of brutality in society", but no "generalized conclusions" could be drawn from it, a spokesman said. Findings about other parties involved "in a criminal sense" would not be available.

The President of the Thuringian State office for the Protection of the Constitution, Stephan Kramer, assessed the situation differently. He said the murder was not surprising. Kramer saw an increasing radicalization of the right-wing scene in the German National Public Radio (DLF). The Office for the Protection of the Constitution had previously warned law-enforcement authorities of the increasing inhibition of violence in the right-wing scene. After all, the tone has become much sharper, especially in social media.

At the same time, Kramer emphasized that differentiation is important: Not all vaccination opponents and lateral thinkers should be criminalized. However, one must be aware that representatives of the right spectrum have tried for years to use emotions to attract votes and to divide society.

Politicians from almost all political groups were affected by the murder. Among others, Olaf Scholz (SPD), Annalena Baerbock (Grüne) and Paul Ziemiak (CDU) expressed their views accordingly.

After the murder, hatred was spread on social media by right-wing extremists. They defended the perpetrator, who is said to have simply been "fed up". As the Berliner Tagesspiegel reports, the chat channel on Telegram of the right-wing extremist conspiracy narrator Sven Liebich was full of posts defending the shooter's act.
