= Current Eye Research =

- Discipline: Ophthalmology
- Language: English
- Edited by: Gerd Geerling, Robert Linsenmeier

Publication details
- History: 1981–present
- Publisher: Taylor and Francis Group (United Kingdom)
- Frequency: Monthly
- Impact factor: 1.639 (2014)

Standard abbreviations
- ISO 4: Curr. Eye Res.

Indexing
- ISSN: 0271-3683 (print); 1460-2202 (web)

Links
- Journal homepage

Current Eye Research is a medical journal covering all areas of ophthalmology. Areas covered include: clinical research, anatomy, physiology, biophysics, biochemistry, pharmacology, developmental biology, microbiology, and immunology

== Editors ==
The editors-in-chief of Current Eye Research are Gerd Geerling (University of Duesseldorf, Germany) and Robert Linsenmeier (Northwestern University, United States).

== Impact factor ==
According to the 2015 Journal Citation Reports, the journal's impact factor is 2.025, ranking it 22nd out of 56 journals in the category (Updated Year: 2015) "Ophthalmology".
