= Gerd Geerling =

Gerd Geerling (born 9 June 1965 in Cologne) is a German consultant ophthalmic surgeon, Professor of Ophthalmology and since 2011 head of the Universitäts-Augenklinik Düsseldorf of the University of Düsseldorf, Germany.

== Biography ==
Geerling studied medicine at the medical school of the RWTH Aachen University and in England. In 1994 he successfully completed his MD thesis - tutored by M. Reim - on Examinations on cornea and conjunctiva after alkali burns by means of scanning electron microscopy and energy-dispersive of x-ray analysis. He obtained board certification as an ophthalmologist in 1996 and worked until 2005 at the department of Ophthalmology of the University Hospital of Schleswig-Holstein in Lübeck. During this period he also was associated as an honorary scientist to the Institute of Biomedical Optics (former Medical Laser Center) of the University of Lübeck.

From 1997 until 2000 (funded by the DFG and Special Trustees) and in 2003 he worked at Moorfields Eye Hospital and the associated Institute of Ophthalmology, University College London receiving subspecialist training from John KG Dart, J Richard O Collin and Geoffrey E Rose in corneal and oculoplastic surgery. He also worked in the basic science laboratory of Sir Peng T Khaw on corneal wound healing.

From 2000 on, Geerling worked as corneal consultant in Lübeck introducing corneal lamellar surgery. In 2003 he completed his Habilitation and was promoted to a lecturer at the University of Lübeck with a thesis on Natural Tear Substitutes. In 2005 he was called to serve an assistant professor for Ophthalmology at the University of Würzburg and became Deputy Director of the Department of Ophthalmology. In Würzburg he received subspecialist training in glaucoma surgery and expanded the local Lions eye bank. In 2011 he moved as Professor for Ophthalmology and Director of the Universitäts-Augenklinik Düsseldorf to the University of Düsseldorf.

Geerling is among others member of the "Deutsche Ophthalmologische Gesellschaft". He has received several national and international awards. Since 2005 he is editor of Current Eye Research.

== Research ==
Geerling's clinical and scientific interests and activities are focused on natural tear substitutes, tissue constructs for ocular surface reconstruction and regeneration as well as new transplantation techniques for the treatment of corneal and ocular surface disorders, in particular dry eye, Corneal disease and keratectasias. He was one of the first to introduce modern lamellar corneal graft techniques in Germany and intraoperative optical coherence tomography in Ophthalmology.

His surgical specialty lies in the anterior segment of the eye, with a particular focus on corneal transplantation. In addition he is specialised in glaucoma and oculoplastic surgery, including lacrimal and orbital tumor surgery. He has published more than 150 manuscripts in scientific journals and books and has edited two books.

== Selected writings ==
- Transplantation of the autologous submandibular gland for most severe cases of keratoconjunctivitis sicca. Coauthors: Peter Sieg, Gerd-Otto Bastian, Horst Laqua. In: Ophthalmology. New York 1998. No. 105, pp. 327–335, ISSN 0161-6420.
- Intraoperative 2-Dimensional Optical Coherence Tomography as a New Tool for Anterior Segment Procedures. Coauthors: Maya Müller, Christian Winter, Hans Hoerauf, S. Oelkers, Horst Laqua, Reginald Birngruber. In: Archives of Ophthalmology. New York 2005. No. 123, pp. 253–257.
- Keratoplastik – Eine vereinfachte Klassifikation. Terminologie zur Erfassung aktueller Operationskonzepte. Coauthor: Berthold Seitz. In: Klinische Monatsblätter für Augenheilkunde, Stuttgart 2005, ISSN 0023-2165.
- Autologous Serum Eyedrops for Ocular Surface Disorders. Coauthor: Dirk Hartwig. In: Essentials in Ophthalmology. Springer, Berlin und Heidelberg 2006, ISSN 1612-3212.
- Geerling, Gerd; Brewitt, Horst (June 2008). Surgery for the Dry Eye: Scientific Evidence and Guidelines for the Clinical Management of Dry Eye Associated Ocular Surface Disease. S. Karger AG. ISBN 978-3-8055-8376-3.
- Influence of Corneal Collagen Crosslinking With Riboflavin and Ultraviolet-A Irradiation on Excimer Laser Surgery. Zusammen mit Daniel Kampik, Bernhard Ralla, Sabine Keller, Mathias Hirschberg, Peter Friedl. In: Investigative Ophthalmology & Visual Science. Hagerstown 2010, No. 8, pp. 3929–3934, ISSN 0146-0404.
- 1-Jahres-Ergebnisse nach posteriorer lamellärer Keratoplastik mit manuell disseziertem Spendermaterial. Coauthors: Katharina Weller, Daniel Unterlauft. In: Klinische Monatsblätter für Augenheilkunde, Stuttgart 2010, No. 227, pp. 460–466, ISSN 0023-2165.
- The International Workshop on Meibomian Gland Dysfunction (TFOS): Report of the Subcommittee on Management and Treatment of Meibomian Gland Dysfunction. Coauthors: Joseph Tauber, Christophe Baudouin, Eiki Goto, Yukihiro Matsumoto, Terrence O'Brien, Maurizio Rolando, Kazuo Tsubota and Kelly K. Nichols. In: Investigative Ophthalmology & Visual Science. March 2011.
