= Marla-Svenja Liebich =

German neo-Nazi (born 1970)

Marla-Svenja Liebich (formerly Sven Liebich; born September 19, 1970 in Merseburg) is a German neo-Nazi activist who has gained nationwide notoriety for her provocations. Liebich is considered one of the key figures in the far-right scene in the state of Saxony-Anhalt. Demonstrations organized by Liebich have repeatedly led to counter-protests, with members of civil society, churches, and antifascist groups taking to the streets. A trans woman, Liebich legally changed her gender and name in 2025, leading to criticism regarding the potential abuse of the new gender self-determination law.

== Life ==
Liebich was born Sven Liebich in Merseburg and grew up in Halle (Saale) with two sisters. Liebich initially worked for the tax office. By the 1990s, Liebich became active in far-right circles, first as a key figure in the Blood & Honour network in Saxony-Anhalt. In the mid-1990s, Liebich established a mail-order business for far-right rock music. Until the business was shut down by the city of Halle in 2023, Liebich also ran the hate blog Halle Leaks and the mail-order company l & h-shirtzshop GmbH, which gained notoriety for its inflammatory slogans on t-shirts and buttons.

In January 2025, Liebich's legal change of her name to Marla-Svenja Liebich and her gender to female became legally effective and public. The jurist Christian Rath described the gender change as "abusive" and a "pure provocation," stating that "anyone who changes their gender merely for provocative purposes will likely continue to be treated as a man in the penal system." She had previously referred to queer people as "parasites of society." Liebich's gender-identity change drew criticism regarding the potential abuse of the new self-determination law. In August 2025, Liebich was summoned to the women's prison at the Chemnitz Correctional Facility to begin a prison sentence. According to the Halle public prosecutor's office, this initial summons is required for first-time inmates under the Saxon enforcement plan. However, the final decision on whether to house the inmate in the men's or women's section is at the discretion of the correctional facility and is made based on "individual considerations".

== Activities ==
=== Far-right extremism in Saxony-Anhalt ===
Since the early 2000s, Liebich has been active in far-right circles in Halle, evolving into a central neo-Nazi figure in Saxony-Anhalt. Critics accuse Liebich of deliberately polarizing the public and fostering a climate of intimidation in and around Halle. According to the 2022 and 2023 reports from the Office for the Protection of the Constitution of Saxony-Anhalt, Liebich's actions are "unprecedented" nationwide. The reports dedicate a separate, multi-page sub-chapter to Liebich each year in the section on far-right extremism.

=== Stances and activities during the COVID-19 pandemic ===
Starting in May 2020, Liebich propagated conspiracy theories, particularly concerning the COVID-19 pandemic in Germany, and organized or called for protests against public health measures.

During the pandemic, she also got a tattoo of a Star of David with the word "unvaccinated" and sold similar star-shaped pins on her online shop. The comparison between the persecution of Jews and the treatment of unvaccinated people during the pandemic caused widespread outrage. This led to a search of the online shop and a criminal complaint for incitement of hatred. Liebich was considered a key figure in the Querdenker-Bewegung movement in Halle.

== Legal disputes ==
In July 2023, the Halle (Saale) District Court sentenced Liebich to one year and six months in prison without parole for distributing baseball bats inscribed with the phrase "deportation helpers" and for other offenses. This sentence also incorporated penalties from a prior conviction by the same court. In August 2024, the Halle Regional Court upheld the sentence and conviction, which included incitement of hatred, slander, and insult, prompting Liebich to file for an appeal. The appeal was ultimately rejected by the Naumburg Higher Regional Court on May 14, 2025, making the verdict legally binding.

In a separate case, the Leipzig District Court sentenced Liebich to seven months in prison without parole in September 2023 for a physical assault on a photographer during a November 2020 COVID-19 demonstration. Liebich appealed this verdict as well. The case was later dismissed by the Leipzig Regional Court in July 2025.

Since the name change in 2024, Liebich has initiated numerous legal actions against those who use her former name. In the summer of 2025, Liebich's X account stated a goal of filing 1,000 complaints, with over 500 already sent to the Halle police department.

On August 18, 2025, the Second Civil Chamber of the Berlin II Regional Court ruled against Liebich in a case where she had sought a preliminary injunction against Julian Reichelt, editor-in-chief of the news portal Nius. Reichelt had indirectly referred to Liebich as a man ("Sven Liebich is not a woman") on the platform "X." The court decided that this infringement on personal rights was justified by the overriding right to freedom of speech and was therefore not unlawful.

On April 9, 2026, Liebich was arrested in Krásná in the Czech Republic. On June 1, 2026, she was extradited to Germany and sent to a men's prison in July.
