= Universitäts-Augenklinik Düsseldorf =

Coordinates: 51°11′49.6″N 6°47′21.8″E

Geography
- Location: Düsseldorf, Germany

Organisation
- Type: Teaching
- Affiliated university: Heinrich-Heine-Universität Düsseldorf

History
- Founded: 1862

The Universitäts-Augenklinik Düsseldorf is the department of Ophthalmology of the University Hospital of Düsseldorf in Germany. It is an internationally renown centre for corneal transplantation, ocular surface disease and management of associated disorders ranging from Glaucoma to oculoplastic surgery. Further subspecialist expertise is established for the diagnosis and surgical and medical treatment of vitreoretinal and macular disorders as well as strabismus.

== History ==
Albert Mooren was the first well known ophthalmologist in Düsseldorf, whose name today is reflected in the postal address of the University Hospital. He trained with the famous founder of the German Ophthalmological Society, Albrecht von Graefe (1828–1870), before becoming chairman of the newly established Eye Hospital of Düsseldorf in 1862. The hospital was promoted to medical school in 1919. Ernst Custodis, Professor and chairman of the department from 1946 to 1967, introduced scleral buckling to ophthalmology in 1949 as a revolutionary new concept to treat retinal detachment. In 1973 the medical school was transferred into and renamed the University Hospital Düsseldorf. Rainer Sundmacher, Professor and chairman from 1986 to 2006 founded in 1995 the Lions Eye Bank of North Rhine-Westphalia. Since then diagnosis and management of corneal disease has been the focus of the department. Since 2011, the Universitäts-Augenklinik Düsseldorf is managed by Gerd Geerling.

== Subspecialty areas ==
=== Anterior Segment ===
Corneal transplantations are the major focus of the department.

- Penetrating keratoplasty
- Anterior and posterior lamellar keratoplasty (DSAEK; DMEK, DALK)

Other areas with subspecialist experience are

- Collagen crosslinking for keratectasias such as keratoconus
- Keratoprosthesis
- Cataract surgery
- Glaucoma surgery

=== Other subspecialist clinics ===
Macular degeneration, diabetic retinopathy and maculopathy and other retinal vascular disorders as well as infectious and inflammatory vitreoretinal disorders are treated in the medical and surgical retina clinic. In the oculoplastic clinic all forms of lid, lacrimal and orbital disorders are treated, including ptosis, entropion, ectropion, dermatochalasis as well reconstructive lacrimal and orbital surgery (e. g. orbital decompression). In the orthoptics and paediatric ophthalmology department strabismus (squint) as well as all forms of neuroophthalmological problems are treated. A school of orthoptics is also run by the eye department.

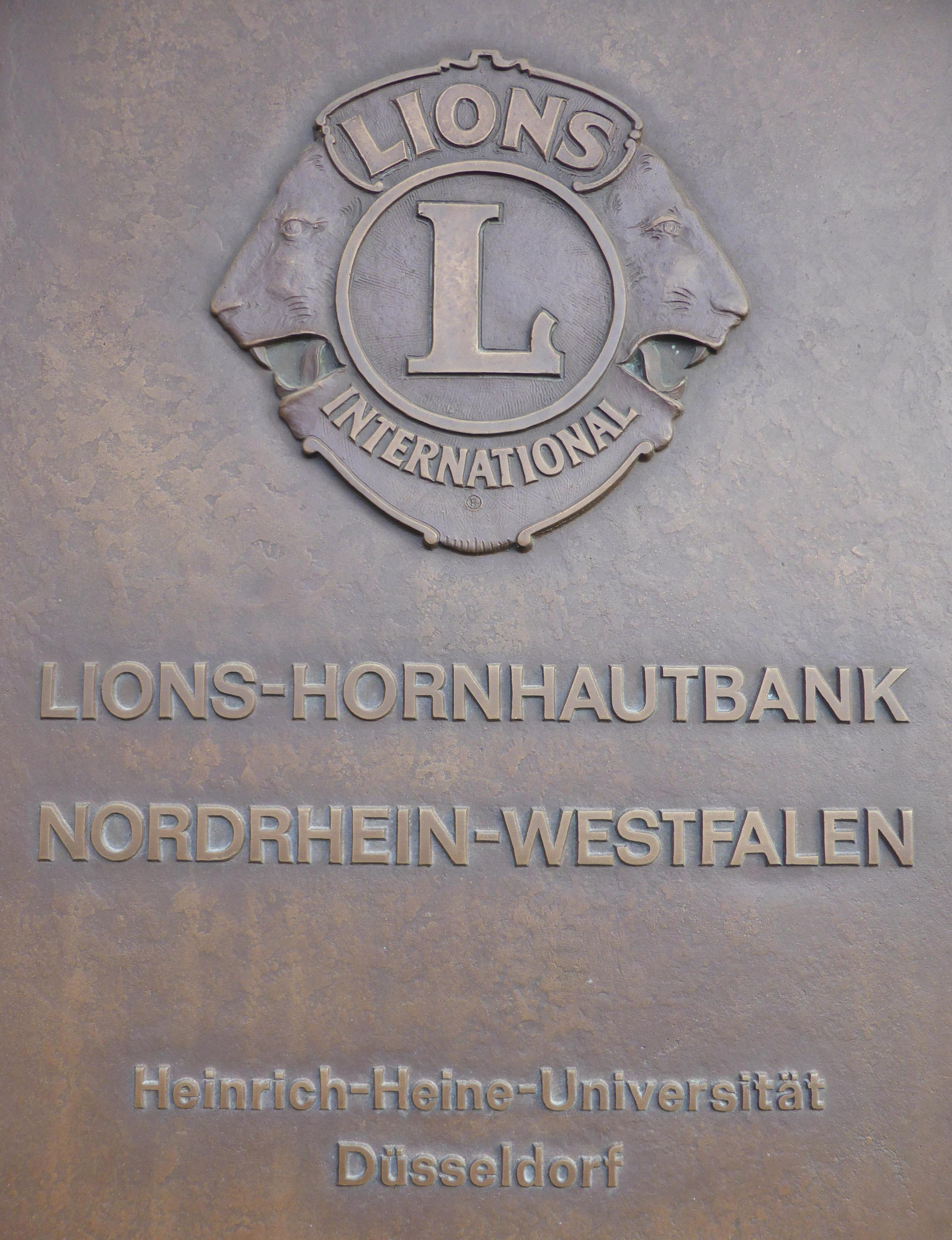
Schild der Lions Hornhautbank NRW an der Universitäts-Augenklinik Düsseldorf

== Lions Eye Bank North Rhine-Westphalia (NRW) ==
The Lions Eye Bank NRW is part of the department and is one of the largest eyebanks in Germany.

== Scientific focus ==
The basic research of the department focusses on translational projects which are carried out at the laboratory for experimental ophthalmology. A number of projects are centered around regenerative medicine of the eye trying to establish tissue constructs for the treatment of corneal and conjunctival disorders, including severe dry eye.

The eye department also has a certified clinical trials unit and as such is member of the EVICR.net (European Vision Clinical Research). It participates in a number of international multicentre trials on

- Dry eye and tear substitutes
- Corneal transplantation
- Vascular diseases of the macula

== Scientific Publications ==
The Universitäts-Augenklinik Düsseldorf has published numerous scientific publications.

== Literature ==
- Hans Joachim Küchle: Augenkliniken deutschsprachiger Hochschulen und ihre Lehrstuhlinhaber im 19. und 20. Jahrhundert. Biermann Verlag, Köln 2005, ISBN 3-930505-47-9.
- Thorsten Halling, Jörg Vögele: 100 Jahre Hochschulmedizin in Düsseldorf 1907-2007. düsseldorf university press, Düsseldorf 2007, ISBN 978-3-940671-00-4.
