= Lions Eye Bank =

Lions Eye Bank is the designation given to the various non-profit eye banks operated by member chapters within the Lions Clubs International service organisation. The banks store and prepare donated corneas for transplantation. Corneas may be stored for up to fourteen days before being distributed to an ophthalmic surgeon for transplantation.

There are over 60 Lions Eye Banks around the world, supported as ongoing projects by Lions service clubs.

== Australia ==
=== New South Wales and Victoria ===
The Lions NSW Eye Bank in Sydney provides over 350 grafts to the people of NSW each year.
The Lions Eye Donation Service Melbourne is a collaboration between The Centre for Eye Research Australia (CERA) of the Royal Victorian Eye and Ear Hospital, the University of Melbourne, and the Lions Clubs of Victoria and Southern New South Wales.

=== Western Australia ===
The Western Australian Lions Eye Bank was established in 1986 and is housed at the Lions Eye Institute in Perth, Western Australia. It is the only facility of its kind in Western Australia, and coordinates the collection, processing and distribution of eye tissue for transplantation. The Bank also maintains a waitlist of patients who require corneal graft operations. About 100 corneas are provided by the Bank for transplant each year. Corneal transplants have a high rate of success, but Western Australia has a shortage of donated human eye tissue.

== Brazil ==
=== Goiás ===
The Fundação Banco De Olhos De Goiás is a project of the Lions Club of Greater Goiânia.

== Canada ==
=== Manitoba and Ontario ===
The Lions Foundation of Manitoba and Northwestern Ontario established the Lions Eye Bank of Manitoba and Northwestern Ontario, located in Winnipeg, in 1984.

=== Saskatchewan ===
The Lions Eye Bank of Saskatchewan in Saskatoon has existed for more than 25 years and operates in partnership with the Saskatchewan Transplant Program.

== Germany ==
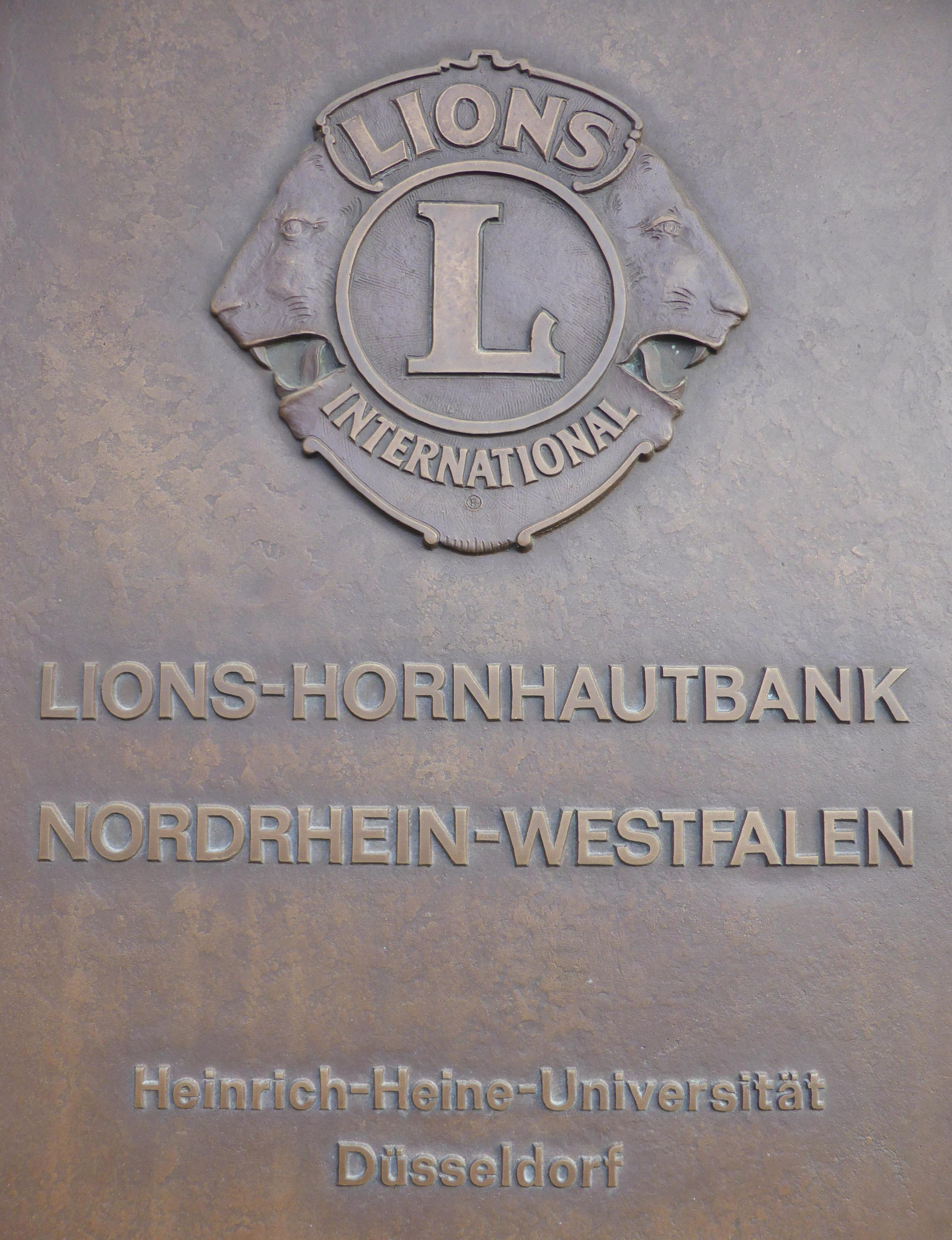
Lions Clubs International logo on display at the Lions Eye Bank (Hornhautbank) NRW at the Universitäts-Augenklinik Düsseldorf.

=== Baden-Württemberg ===
The Lions Eye Bank BW is part of the University Medical Center Freiburg.

=== North Rhine-Westphalia ===
The Lions Eye Bank NRW was established in 1995 and is part of the Universitäts-Augenklinik Düsseldorf.

== Indonesia ==
=== Jakarta ===
The Lions Eye Bank Jakarta (LEBJ) operates in collaboration with the Indonesia Lions Foundation and JEC Eye Hospitals and Clinics, the first eye hospital in Indonesia to achieve Joint Commission International accreditation. Established in November 2017, LEBJ has facilitated over 125 corneal transplants to date.

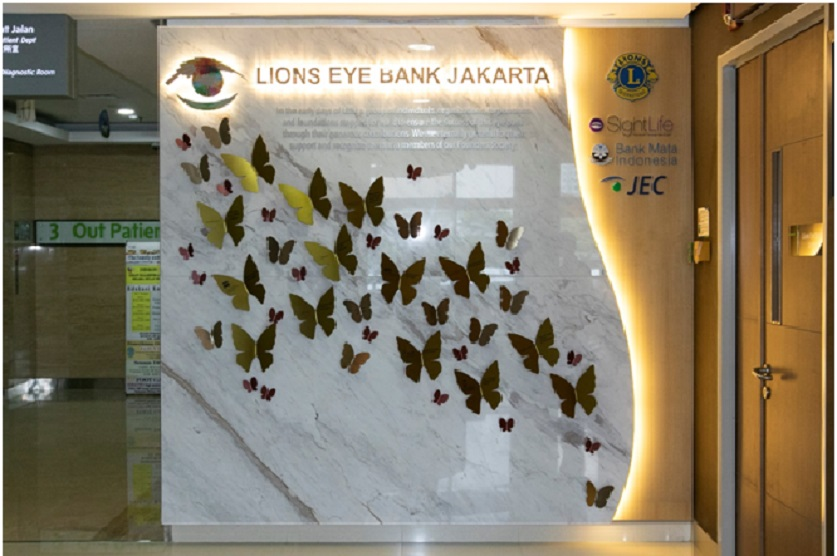

== United States ==
=== Arkansas ===
The Arkansas Lions Eye Bank & Lab is located in Little Rock.

=== Colorado ===
The Rocky Mountain Lions Eye Bank is located in Aurora and provides tissue for over 2,500 cornea transplants each year to recipients in Colorado and Wyoming.

=== Florida ===
The Florida Lions Eye Bank is located in Miami.

=== Hawai'i ===
The Lions Eye Bank of Hawai'i is located in Honolulu and is a project of the District 50 Lions Club.

=== Idaho ===
Envision, located in Boise, is a project of the District 39E Eastern Idaho and District 39W Western Idaho Lions Clubs.

=== Indiana ===
VisionFirst, also known as the Indiana Lions Eye Bank, is the largest eye bank in Indiana and provides over 2,000 corneas annually for transplant. It is located in Indianapolis.

=== Iowa ===
The Iowa Lions Eye Bank is located in Iowa City and is affiliated with the Department of Ophthalmology and Visual Sciences at the University of Iowa Hospitals and Clinics.

=== Kentucky ===
The Kentucky Lions Eye Bank is located in Louisville.

=== Minnesota ===
Lions Gift of Sight, located in Minneapolis, is part of the Department of Ophthalmology and Visual Neurosciences at the University of Minnesota, and provides over 1,000 corneas annually.

=== Mississippi ===
The Mississippi Lions Eye Bank is located in Flowood.

=== Nebraska ===
The Lions Eye Bank of Nebraska is located in Omaha and was established in 1960.

=== New Mexico ===
The New Mexico Lions Eye Bank is located in Albuquerque and is operated by CorneaGen.

=== New York ===
Lions Eye Bank for Long Island
Lions Eye Bank at Albany
Lions Eye Bank at Rochester

=== Ohio ===
Central Ohio Lions Eye Bank
Lions Eye Bank of West Central Ohio

=== Oklahoma ===
Oklahoma Lions Eye Bank

=== Pennsylvania ===
Lions Eye Bank of the Delaware Valley
Lions Eye Bank of Northwest Pennsylvania

=== Puerto Rico ===
Lions Eye Bank of Puerto Rico

=== South Dakota ===
Dakota Lions Sight & Health

=== Tennessee ===
East Tennessee Lions Eye Bank

=== Texas ===
District 2-E1 Lions Tissue and Eye Bank
Lions Eye Bank of Texas
Great Plains Lions Eye Bank
Western Texas Lions Eye Bank Alliance

=== Utah ===
Utah Lions Eye Bank & John A. Moran Eye Center

=== Virginia ===
Lions Medical Eye Bank & Research Center of Eastern Virginia

=== Wisconsin ===
Lions Eye Bank of Wisconsin
