= COVID-19 pandemic in Germany =

- Disease: COVID-19
- Pathogen: SARS-CoV-2
- Location: Germany
- First outbreak: Wuhan, Hubei, China
- Index case: Bavaria
- Arrival date: 27 January 2020 (6 years, 9 months, 3 weeks and 2 days)
- Confirmed cases: 38,437,953
- Recovered: 4,328,400 (estimate) (Note: There are no official numbers for how many have recovered, because recoveries are not always reported in Germany. The number here is an estimate by the Robert Koch Institute.)
- Deaths: 174,979
- Fatality rate: 0.46%
- Vaccinations: 64,876,300 (total vaccinated); 63,566,136 (fully vaccinated); 193,241,460 (doses administered)

The COVID-19 pandemic in Germany has resulted in 38,437,953 confirmed cases of COVID-19 and 174,979 deaths.

On 27 January 2020, the first case in Germany was confirmed near Munich, Bavaria. By mid February, the arising cluster of cases had been fully contained. On 25 and 26 February, multiple cases related to the Italian outbreak were detected in Baden-Württemberg. A carnival event on 15 February in Heinsberg, North Rhine-Westphalia, was attended by a man identified as positive on 25 February; in the outbreak which subsequently developed from infected participants, authorities were mostly no longer able to trace the likely chains of infections. On 9 March, the first two deaths in Germany were reported from Essen and Heinsberg. New clusters were introduced in other regions via Heinsberg as well as via people arriving from China, Iran and Italy, from where non-Germans could arrive by plane until 17–18 March. From 13 March, German states mandated school and kindergarten closures, postponed academic semesters and prohibited visits to nursing homes to protect the elderly. Two days later, borders to Austria, Denmark, France, Luxembourg and Switzerland were closed. By 22 March, curfews were imposed in six German states while other states prohibited physical contact with more than one person from outside one's household.

On 15 April 2020, Chancellor Angela Merkel spoke of "fragile intermediate success" that had been achieved in the fight against the pandemic. The same day, a first loosening of restrictions was announced, continued in early May, and eventually, holiday travels were allowed in cooperation with other European countries. A number of state premiers pressed for faster relaxation of restrictions, putting them at odds with Merkel, who favoured a more cautious approach, a pattern that repeated itself later that year. Substantial local outbreaks in meat processing plants drew public attention beyond the epidemiological context to poor working conditions. By late August, infection numbers had returned to the levels of April, and a possible second wave of the pandemic was under debate. By mid October, it was believed by experts to be inevitable. A partial lockdown from 2 November only temporarily halted the rise in case numbers; the total number of reported infections since the start of the pandemic crossed one million on 27 November. A hard lockdown from 15 December made FFP2 masks or other clinical masks mandatory on public transport and in shops. Repeated lockdown extensions were mainly motivated by the appearance of the Alpha variant and other mutations. Death rates in nursing homes remained high until late January 2021 but dropped strongly in February, likely due to residents and workers at these facilities having been prioritised in the vaccination campaign. The second wave peaked in January.

In March 2021, the Alpha variant drove a third wave of infections. The average age of the infected, as well as of those requiring intensive care, was much younger than in the first two waves. A reform of the Infection Protection Act in late April increased federal government powers, allowing it to mandate pandemic measures in hard-hit districts; in November 2021, the measures were ruled by the Federal Constitutional Court to have been legal. From late April, infection numbers started to continuously decrease; the third wave was seen as broken by early May. The Delta variant became dominant among the new infections by the end of June, and from early July, cases started to increase again. On 20 August, the RKI assessed the country to have entered the fourth wave of the pandemic, again with most of the cases coming from the younger age groups. With effect from 23 August, the so-called 3G rule gave those who were vaccinated, had recovered, or had a negative test result no older than 24 hours more freedom to visit numerous venues. From mid October, infections and intensive care unit admissions started to increase again. On 4 November, as almost 34,000 reported infections set a new record since the beginning of the pandemic, Health Minister Jens Spahn spoke of a "pandemic of the unvaccinated", which was criticized by scientists for underrating the role of the vaccinated in the pandemic. Unprecedentedly high infection numbers led Germany to reintroduce free coronavirus testing in November, a month after they had been phased out, and to launch a booster campaign. Booster vaccinations were declared by new Health Minister Karl Lauterbach to be central to the government strategy of combating the Omicron variant. Warnings of a "massive fifth wave" driven by Omicron in December proved to be no exaggeration as daily case numbers rose up to over 200,000 by mid February 2022, and remained at a high level in March. Experts considered the absence of a decrease to be due to the BA.2 subvariant of Omicron, which had ushered in the sixth wave of the pandemic, and expected more cases after the easing of pandemic measures scheduled to begin on 21 March.

Vaccinations with the Pfizer–BioNTech COVID-19 vaccine began on 27 December 2020 (unofficially one day earlier); vaccinations with the Moderna COVID-19 vaccine, the AstraZeneca vaccine and the Janssen COVID-19 vaccine began in mid January, early February, and mid March 2021 respectively. Vaccinations with AstraZeneca were stalled on 16 March 2021 due to concerns about rare and potentially lethal side effects but resumed on 19 March after the European Medicines Agency deemed the vaccine "safe and effective". On 30 March, German vaccination commission STIKO recommended limiting the use of the AstraZeneca vaccine to those aged 60 or over, but revised this on 22 April to allow for use in younger ages, subject to their consent to medical advice about the risks. Vaccinations accelerated in April, with a total of 15 million shots given that month. On 6 May, the AstraZeneca vaccine was made available to all adults, with the Johnson & Johnson vaccine following on 10 May and all others on 7 June. Vaccination with AstraZeneca ceased on 1 December 2021. On 3 February 2022, the Novavax COVID-19 vaccine was approved. As of 25 November 2021, 68.1 per cent of the total population had completed their vaccination, with considerable regional variation across states. In mid-January 2022, the RKI reported that just under 75 per cent had received at least one vaccination.

== Background ==
=== Outbreak of a novel coronavirus disease ===
On 12 January 2020, the World Health Organization (WHO) confirmed that a novel coronavirus was the cause of a respiratory illness in a cluster of people in Wuhan, Hubei, China, which was reported to the WHO on 31 December 2019.

The case fatality ratio for COVID-19 is lower than SARS of 2003, but the transmission has been significantly greater, with a significant total death toll.

=== Infection Protection Act ===
In the implementation of federal and state guidelines to contain the COVID-19 pandemic, the Infection Protection Act (Infektionsschutzgesetz, IfSG) has played a central role. Enacted in 2000, the IfSG authorises state governments to issue regulations to control communicable diseases, and to order protective measures including quarantine, thus granting them considerable power in relation to the federal government, whose primary task is to coordinate the measures taken. Pressure by state premiers repeatedly forced Chancellor Merkel to soften anti-pandemic measures.

In March 2020, the federal government drafted a change to the IfSG to allow the federal government more power over the federal states. Among others it would allow the health ministry to prohibit border crossings, track the contacts of infected persons and enlist doctors, medicine students and other health care workers in the efforts against an infectious disease. A condition for use of the additional powers is the determination of an epidemic situation of national significance (de:Epidemische Lage von nationaler Tragweite). The Bundestag made this determination on 25 March, the same day it approved the amendments to the IfSG. The amendments became law on 27 March. The determination was extended repeatedly, for the fourth time on 25 August 2021 for tentatively three months. In a 11 November Bundestag debate, chancellor-in-waiting Olaf Scholz pushed for the state of emergency to end on 25 November as scheduled; in justification of this measure, which was expected to go ahead, fellow Social Democrat Dirk Wiese said that "lockdowns for the entire republic and de-facto occupational bans ... we no longer consider proportionate". On the same occasion, Scholz called for parliamentary support for a catalogue of new measures that would replace the state of emergency.

On 18 November 2020, a reform of the IfSG which had been proposed by the ruling Grand coalition was passed in the Bundestag with 415 votes in favour, 236 against, and eight abstentions. The regulations of the law include a specification of the scope of measures which may be taken by individual states to combat a health emergency such as the current pandemic. The purpose of the law was to put measures that had been previously enacted by decree on a more firm legal basis. It also addressed complaints from across the political spectrum about what they saw as diminished role of the parliament. The opposition parties in parliament remained dissatisfied with the reformed law.

A further revision of the IfSG came into force on 22 April 2021, allowing the federal government to mandate curfews from 24 April.

=== National Pandemic Plan ===
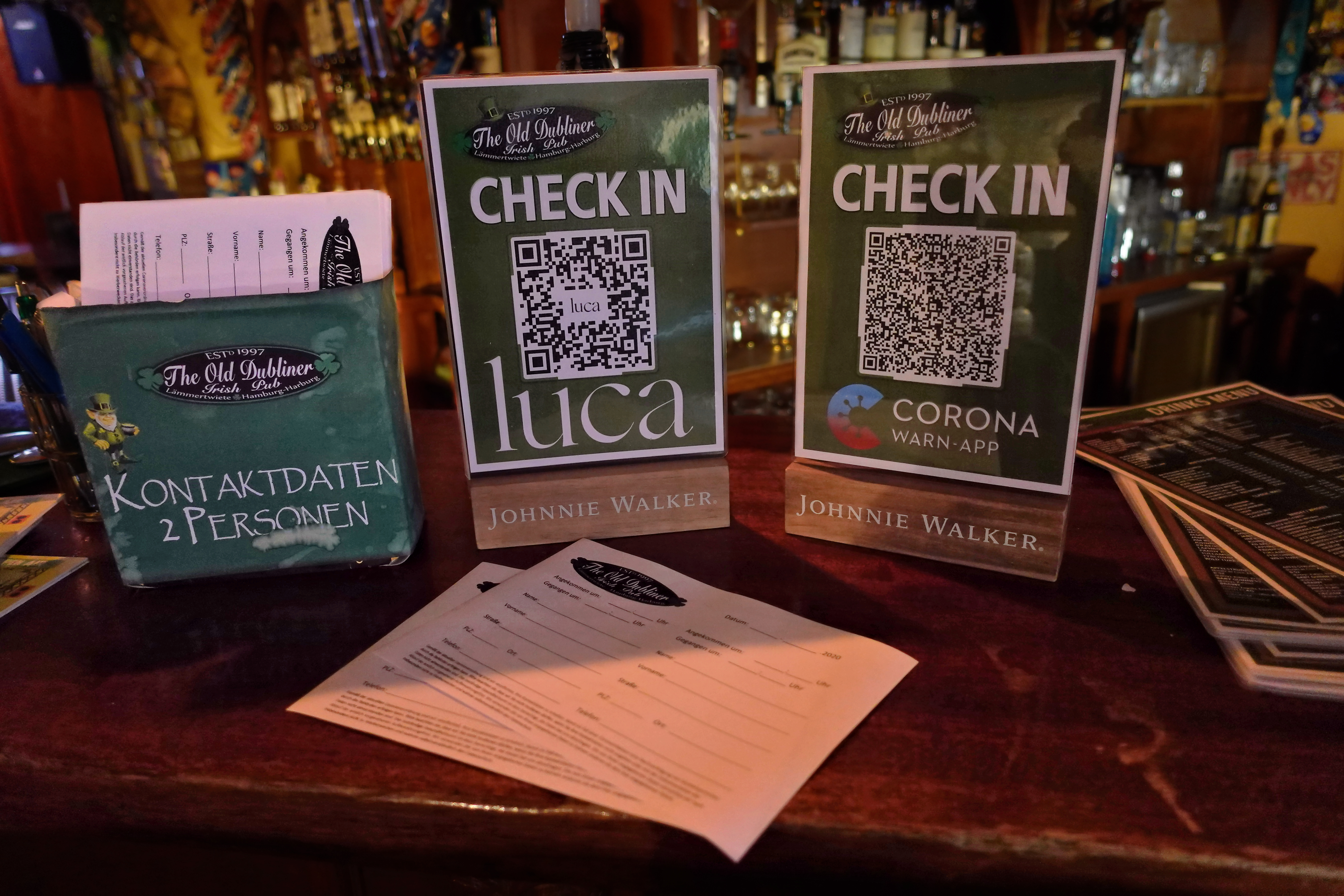
Three ways to sign in for contact tracing during the COVID-19 pandemic in Germany

Germany has a common National Pandemic Plan, which describes the responsibilities and measures of the health care system actors in case of a huge epidemic. Epidemic control is executed both by the federal authorities such as Robert Koch Institute and by the German states. The German states have their own epidemic plans. On 4 March, the RKI published an extension of the national plan, which it had produced in collaboration with several other entities, for the handling of the ongoing coronavirus pandemic. Four major targets are included in this plan:

- Reduce morbidity and mortality
- Ensure treatment of infected persons
- Upkeep of essential public services
- Reliable and accurate information for decision-makers, medical professionals, media and public

The plan has three stages, which might eventually overlap due to regional differences in the evolution of the pandemic:

- Containment (circumstances of dedicated cases and clusters)
- Protection (circumstances of further spreading infections and unknown sources of infections)
- Mitigation (circumstances of widespread infections)

In the containment stage health authorities are focusing on identifying contact persons who are put in personal quarantine and are monitored and tested. Personal quarantine is overseen by the local health agencies. By doing so, authorities are trying to keep infection chains short, leading to curtailed clusters. As of 4 March 2020, the pandemic was managed in the containment stage. In the protection stage the strategy will change to using direct measures to protect vulnerable persons from becoming infected. The mitigation stage will eventually try to avoid spikes of intensive treatment in order to maintain medical services.

=== Criticism over slow procurement of protective materials ===
As early as January 2020, the German Bundestag was fully informed about the dangers of the global spread of a coronavirus pandemic. A risk analysis predicted how dangerous a global coronavirus outbreak could be. It stated that "children [...] have [...] minor disease progressions" and that the risk of death of "over-65-year-olds [is] at 50%". It further stated that a "vaccine" is "unavailable", so all the more important is the "use of protective equipment such as protective masks, goggles and gloves". But until 24 March, the Federal Office of Civil Protection and Disaster Assistance (BBK) had never set up appropriate stores or had talks with manufacturers and suppliers to prepare for such a situation, was the criticism of some experts.

== Timeline by state ==
Cases

Deaths

=== Baden-Württemberg ===
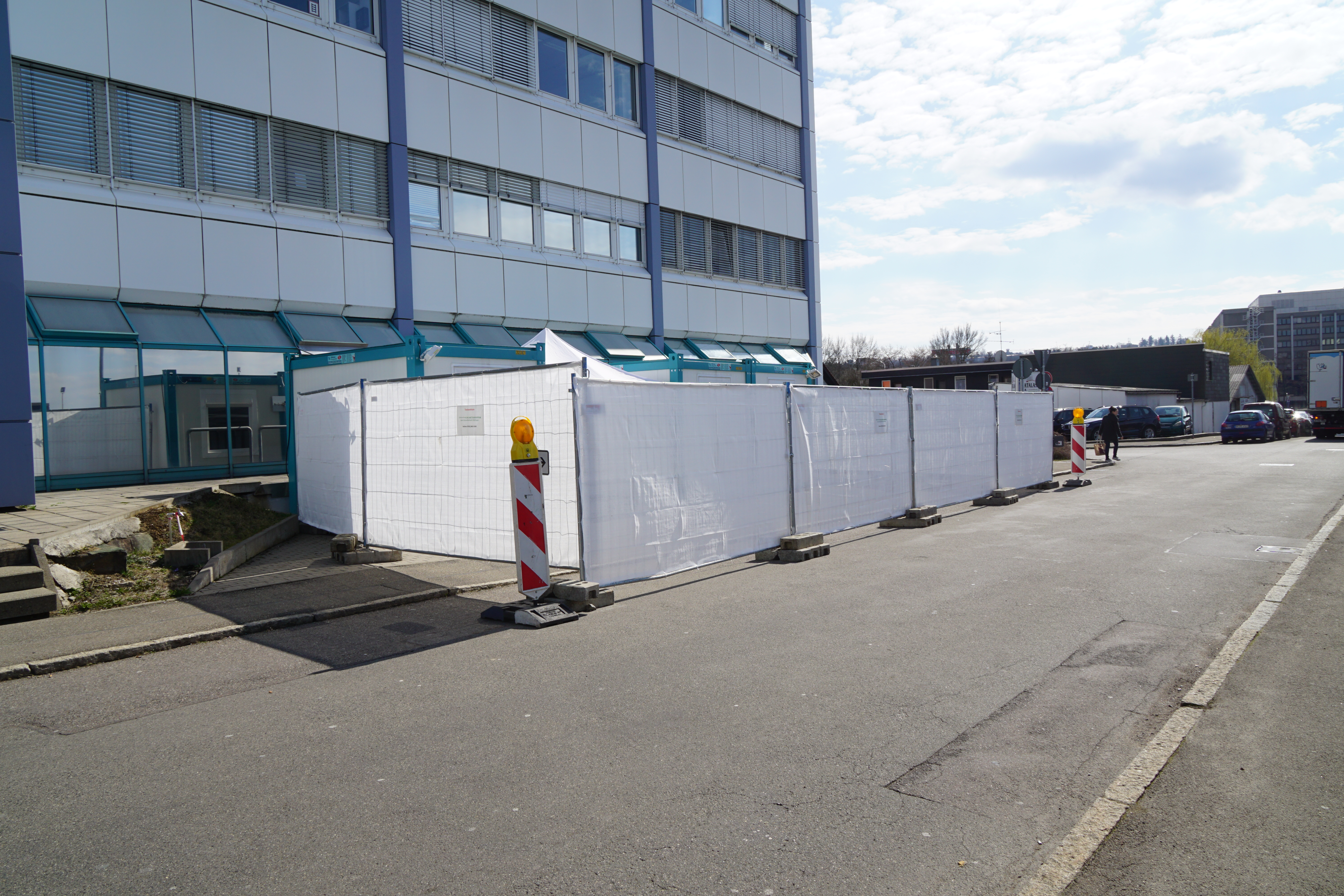
A test centre in Sindelfingen, Baden-Württemberg. Viral throat swabs are taken in a tent outside to avoid contaminating the laboratory.

On 25 February, a 25-year-old man from Göppingen, Baden-Württemberg, who had recently returned from Milan, Italy, tested positive and was treated in Klinik am Eichert. On 26 February, Baden-Württemberg confirmed three new cases. The 24-year-old girlfriend of the 25-year-old man from Göppingen and her 60-year-old father, who worked as a chief physician at University Hospital Tübingen, tested positive and were admitted to the same hospital in Tübingen. A 32-year-old man from Rottweil, Baden-Württemberg, who had visited Codogno, Italy with his family on 23 February, tested positive and was admitted to a hospital for isolation.

On 27 February, Baden-Württemberg confirmed four new cases, for a total of eight cases in the region. Two women and a man from Breisgau-Hochschwarzwald and Freiburg, respectively, tested positive. They had had contact with an Italian participant at a business meeting in Munich; he was subsequently tested positive in Italy. A man from the district of Böblingen, who had had contact with the travel companion of the patient from Göppingen, also tested positive.

On 28 February, Baden-Württemberg confirmed five new cases, bringing the total number of cases in the state to thirteen. A man from Ludwigsburg with flu symptoms who had tested negative for influenza virus was automatically tested for SARS-CoV-2 and confirmed positive. A man from Rhine-Neckar returning from a short ski holiday with mild cold symptoms checked himself in to the emergency department of the University Hospital Heidelberg and tested positive. A 32-year-old man in Heilbronn tested positive and was admitted to a hospital. He had been in Milan on 21 February and fallen ill with flu symptoms on 23 February. A man from Nuremberg who was in Karlsruhe on business was admitted to the Karlsruhe City Hospital after testing positive. His family in Nuremberg was also ill with respiratory symptoms. A man from Breisgau who had travelled to Bergamo, Italy also tested positive and underwent isolation.

After the ease of lockdown, a group of Germans who had been working in China was allowed to return. On arrival in Tianjin on 29 May 2020, Chinese authorities tested a 34-year-old engineer from Blaustein positive for the coronavirus. A test on departure in Frankfurt had shown no infection.

=== Bavaria ===
On 27 January 2020, the Bavarian Ministry of Health announced that a 52-year-old employee of Webasto, a German car parts supplier at Starnberg, Bavaria had tested positive for SARS-CoV-2. He contracted the infection from a Chinese colleague who had received a visit in Shanghai from her parents from Wuhan. His was the first known case of a person contracting the virus outside of China from a non-relative – the first known transmission of the virus outside China being father to son in Vietnam.

On 28 January, three more cases were confirmed, a 27-year-old and a 40-year-old man as well as a 33-year-old woman. All three were also employees of Webasto. They were monitored and quarantined at the München Hospital in Schwabing.

On 30 January, a man from Siegsdorf who worked for the same company tested positive; on 31 January and 3 February respectively, both his children tested positive. His wife also tested positive on 6 February. A 52-year-old Webasto employee from Fürstenfeldbruck tested positive.

On 1 February, a 33-year-old Webasto employee living in Munich tested positive. On 3 February, another employee was confirmed positive. On 7 February, the wife of a previously diagnosed man tested positive. On 11 February, a 49-year-old Webasto employee tested positive, as did a family member of a previously diagnosed employee.

According to reconstruction analysis published in September 2020, the outbreak at Webasto had not seeded the COVID-19 outbreak in Italy, with the evidence pointing instead to the latter outbreak having been initiated by cases imported directly from China.

On 27 February, Bavaria confirmed that a man from Middle Franconia tested positive after he had contact with an Italian man who later tested positive as well.

On 8 March, an 83-year-old resident of the St. Nikolaus home of the elderly in Würzburg was brought into hospital and died four days later diagnosed with COVID-19, becoming the first reported death of the virus in Bavaria. By 27 March, ten more residents of the St. Nikolaus home of the elderly had also died of the virus and 44 residents and 32 employees tested positive. The residency complained about a lack of personnel and protective equipment.

On 12 August 2020, Bavarian health authorities admitted that they had not yet informed over 44,000 returning travellers about the results of their COVID-19 tests, mostly taken at mobile testing centres at highways. It was believed that there had been over 900 positive cases among these. The government explained the glitch with missing software and an unexpected large number of volunteers tested. Health Minister Melanie Huml reportedly offered her resignation to premier Soeder, whose decision to leave her in office was met with sharp criticism by the parliamentary opposition. In January 2021, Huml was moved to a position in the Bavarian State Chancellery.

From 18 January 2021, pursuant to a 12 January decision, Bavaria made the wearing of FFP2 masks mandatory on public transport and in supermarkets, excepting bus drivers, ticket inspectors, and children aged up to 14 years. The new rule would not be policed until 24 January. The Bavarian government said it would provide masks free of charge to low-income groups and social welfare recipients.

Due to the number of occupied intensive care beds reaching 609 on 8 November 2021, thereby exceeding the threshold of 600, the Corona-Ampel (corona traffic light) jumped to red in the state, triggering a tightening of pandemic restrictions. It had been green just days earlier. With immediate effect, access to gyms and sports facilities, as well as museums and cultural facilities, was reduced from that under the 3G rule, covering the fully vaccinated, the recovered, or those who had recently tested negative, to the 2G rule, which excluded the third mentioned group. Only to those under the age of 12, for which age group no COVID-19 vaccine had been approved, would the 3G rule still applied, as well as to discretionary cases on medical grounds. Restaurants, hairdressers, universities and libraries were to continue to apply the 3G rule.

=== Berlin ===
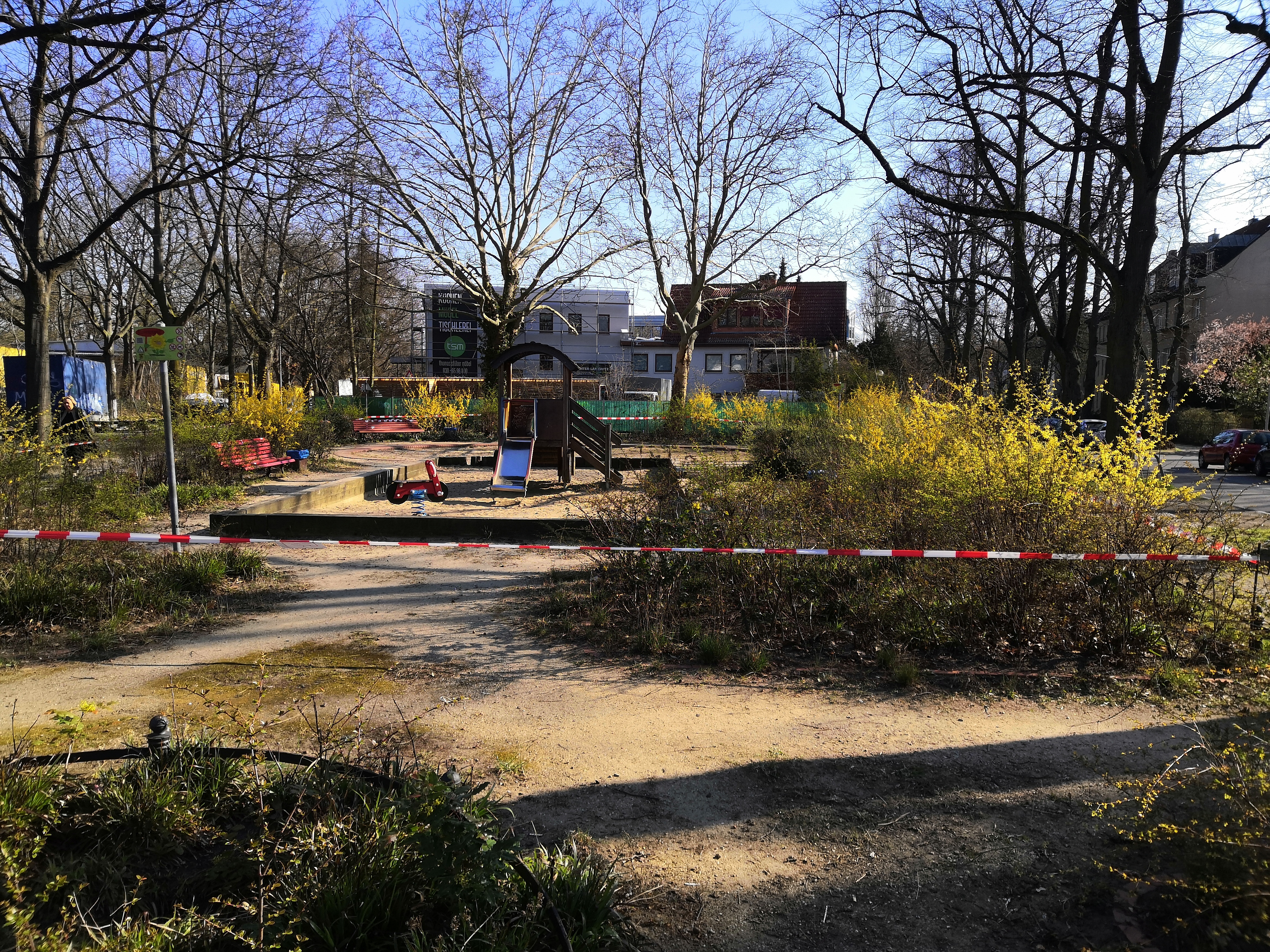
A closed off playground in Lankwitz, Berlin

The first case detected in the capital, Berlin, was reported on 2 March 2020. On 17 March, the government of Berlin announced plans to open a 1,000-bed hospital for COVID-19 patients on the grounds of Messe Berlin in the Westend locality of Charlottenburg-Wilmersdorf. The hospital opened on 11 May 2020.

On November 15, 2021, Berlin banned unvaccinated citizens from restaurants, bars, cinemas and other entertainment venues, and now require them to present a negative COVID test to travel by bus or train. The measures have been implemented due to the largest increase in case counts to date.

In January 2022, a spokesman of the Berlin government told Reuters that public services including transportation, police and child care were reshuffling operations to cope with an increasing number of staff in quarantine.

=== Hamburg ===
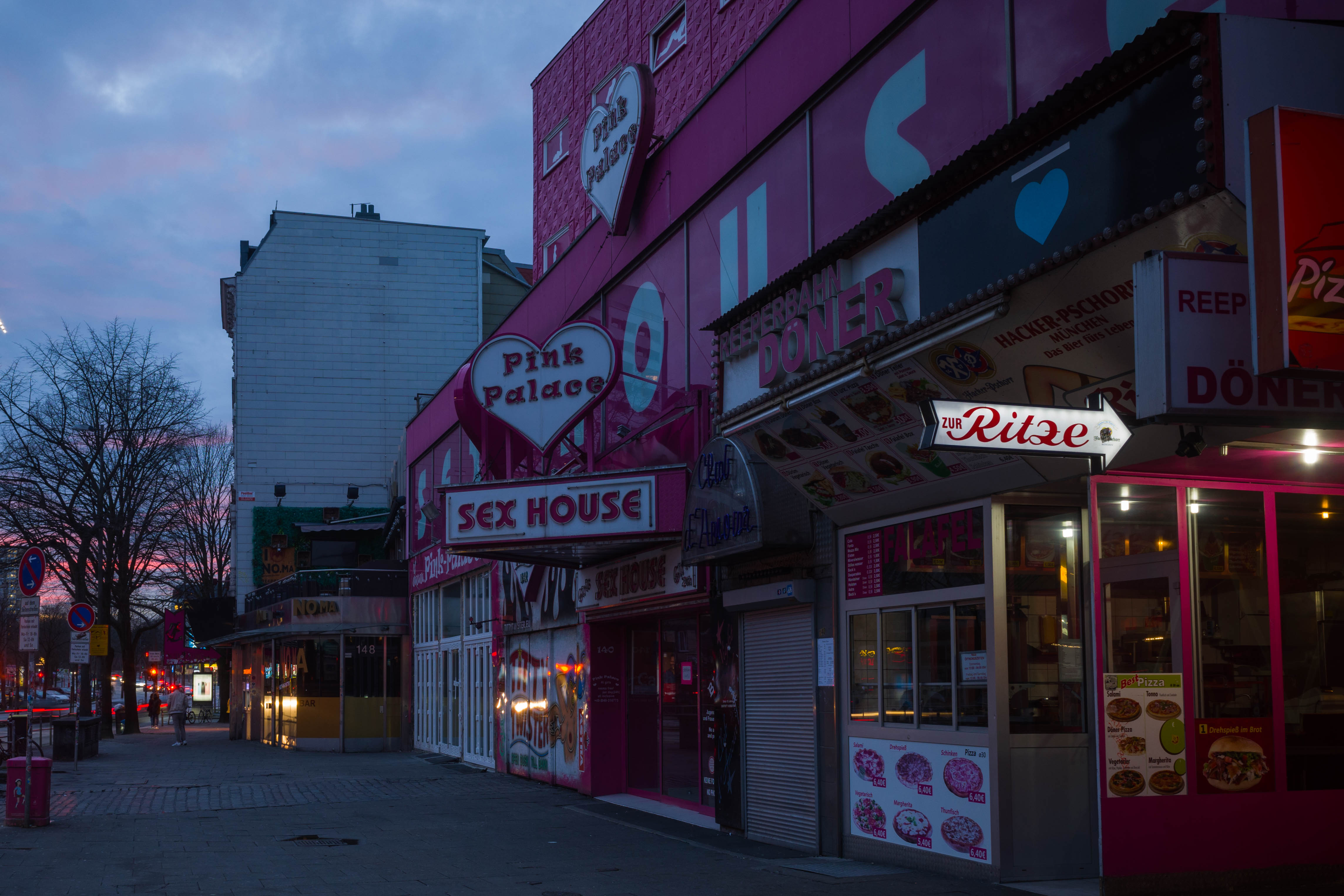
Near-empty red-light district in Hamburg on 17 March

Hamburg's first case, a male paediatric member of staff at the University Medical Center Hamburg-Eppendorf, was confirmed on 27 February. As of 15 March 2020, there are 196 active cases.

=== Hesse ===
On 28 February, Hesse officials confirmed three new cases in Lahn-Dill, Hochtaunuskreis and Giessen. The cases in Lahn-Dill and Giessen were linked to the cluster in NRW, and the case in Hochtaunuskreis to the one in Lahn-Dill.

After the ease of lockdown for religious groups on 1 May, a church service on 10 May in Frankfurt led to a cluster that grew to 112 cases by 25 May. The service was later determined to have breached several regulations, including those that the major churches had given themselves. The church evaded penalties through participation in a study by the RKI, whose scientists had expressed great interest in studying the outbreak in detail. All of the infected had recovered by 24 June.

=== Lower Saxony ===
On 1 March 2020, Lower Saxony reported its first case. After the ease of lockdown in early May 2020 about 40 people met on 15 May for a private party in a restaurant in Moormerland. By 24 May at least 10 of the participants had tested positive and quarantine was ordered for 70 people.

On 31 May 2020, a new cluster with 36 confirmed infections was reported in Göttingen. The local authorities checked Hookah lounges to find the source of the infections. Mayor Rolf-Georg Köhler informed the public on 2 June that the cluster originated in Eid al-Fitr celebrations by several families on 23 May where social distancing rules had been ignored. On 4 June 2020, the city reported 86 infections from the cluster and some 216 people had been ordered in quarantine. All schools were closed again and all contact and team sports were prohibited for 2 weeks.

=== North Rhine-Westphalia ===
On 25 February, a 47-year-old man tested positive in Erkelenz, Heinsberg at North Rhine-Westphalia. He had been previously treated at University Hospital of Cologne on 13 and 19 February for a pre-existing medical condition. 41 medical staff members and patients were identified to have had contact with him at the hospital; one person from medical staff showed symptoms and tested positive for SARS-CoV-2.

On 26 February, the man's wife, a kindergarten teacher, tested positive; both were isolated at University Hospital of Düsseldorf. His colleague and her partner also tested positive.

On 27 February, Heinsberg confirmed fourteen new cases: nine from Gangelt, two from Selfkant, one from the city of Heinsberg, one from Düsseldorf and one from Herzogenrath. Multiple cases were linked to the Gangelter Carnival. All of them were placed in home isolation. This brought the current total to twenty in the district. A medical doctor in Mönchengladbach tested positive and was quarantined at home. He had attended the same carnival event in Gangelt.

On 28 February, Aachen confirmed the first COVID-19 case in the region, a woman from Herzogenrath (Aachen district), who had attended the carnival event in Gangelt on 15 February and underwent home isolation. Heinsberg confirmed 17 new cases, bringing the current total to 37 cases in the district.

On 29 February, the number of confirmed cases in Heinsberg rose to sixty. Additionally, one case was confirmed in Bonn, three more in the Aachen district (one in Aachen and two in Würselen), and one in Lüdenscheid. Cologne, Mönchengladbach and Duisburg also each reported two cases. The first cases in Münster were confirmed.

On 1 March, cases in Heinsberg rose to 68. A case was confirmed in Rheinisch-Bergischer Kreis, affecting a woman from Overath.

On 2 March, the number of positive cases in Heinsberg increased to 79. The Unna district reported its first case, a 61-year-old woman.

On 3 March, cases in Heinsberg rose to 84. Two more cases were confirmed in Münster. The first case was confirmed in Neuss.

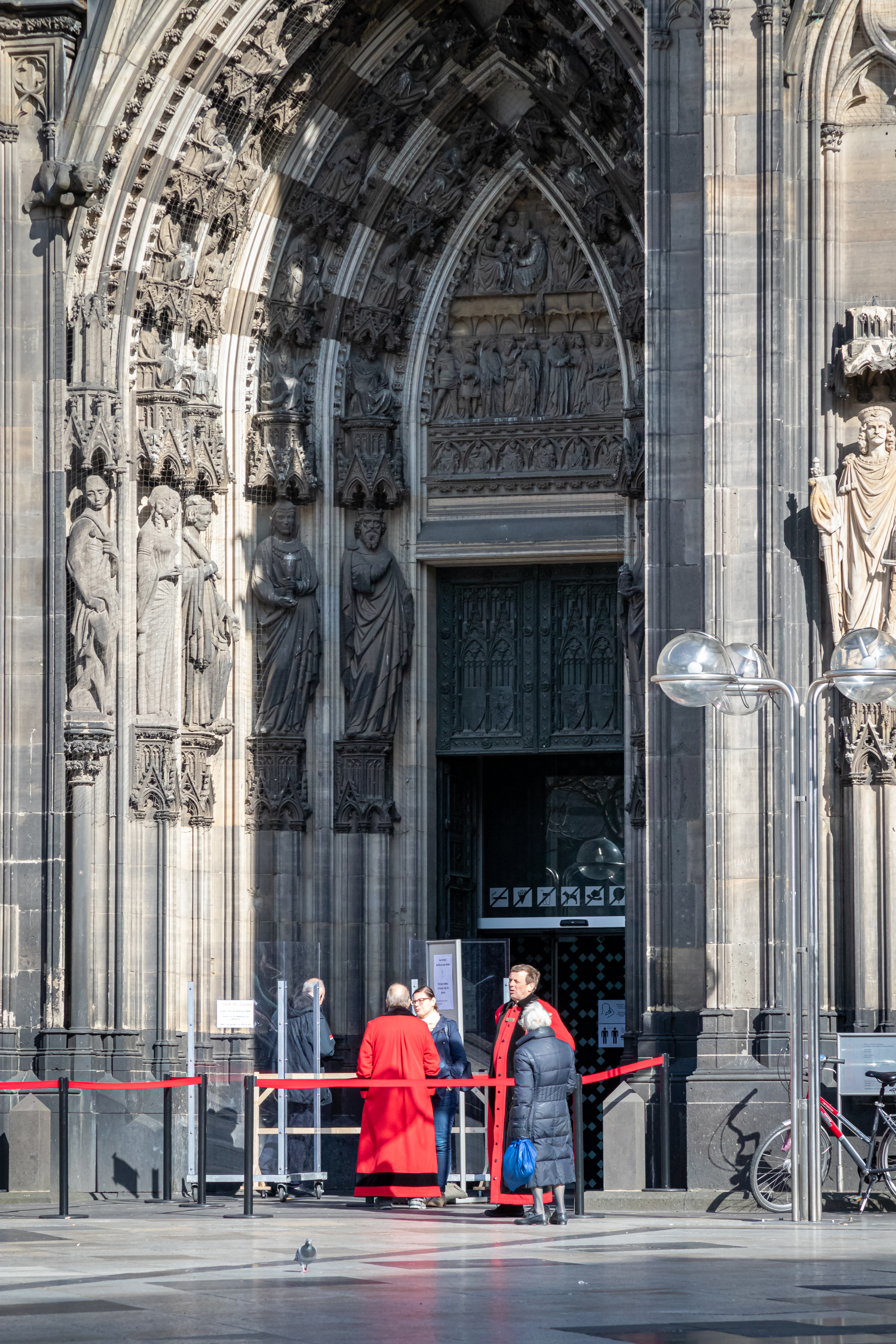
Entrance control at the Cologne Cathedral on 21 March to allow admission only to people who want to pray.

On 4 March, the first case in Bochum was confirmed when a 68-year-old man returning from holiday in Italy tested positive.

On 5 March 195 cases were confirmed by laboratory test in Heinsberg. The local authorities announced that all schools, kindergartens, daycare facilities and interdisciplinary early intervention centres would remain closed until at least 15 March 2020. Six people tested positive in Münster, of which four were pupils and one a child in a day care centre. The school and the day care centre were closed as a precaution.

On 6 March, confirmed cases in Heinsberg rose to 220. A mobile medical care unit was deployed in Gangelt-Birgden. Bochum's second case was confirmed, after the wife of the city's first confirmed case also tested positive.

On 7 March, three cases were confirmed in Remscheid and one in Wermelskirchen. Bochum reported its third case, a 58-year-old man from Weitmar who had returned from a holiday in Italy.

On 8 March, the count of cases in the state rose to 484. Of these, 277 were in Heinsberg. Bochum recorded its fourth case after a woman tested positive after returning from a holiday in South Tyrol, Italy. She went into quarantine at home. A 44-year-old Münster resident tested positive and underwent quarantine with his family. Düsseldorf confirmed its fourth case, a man who had contact with individuals in Heinsberg. All cases in Düsseldorf were reported to be asymptomatic, or with mild symptoms. There were six new infections in Erkrath, Mettmann district. An additional three people were infected with the virus in Bergkamen, Unna district. They are believed to have come into contact with an infected person during a visit to Hamburg.

On 9 March, the first COVID-19 deaths in Germany, an 89-year-old woman in Essen and a 78-year-old man in Heinsberg, were reported.

By the evening of 10 March, the count of cases in the state rose to 648. All mass events in North Rhine-Westphalia with more than 1000 participants were banned with immediate effect.

On 11 March, the number of positive cases in North Rhine-Westphalia increased to 801, including three deaths.

On 13 March, all schools and kindergartens were closed by the government of North Rhine-Westphalia.

In September, the city of Hamm became a hotspot after the obligation to wear masks and to keep distance had been ignored at three events with some 500 guests surrounding a Turkish wedding in early September. By 24 September, some 179 individuals from that wedding were described as "acute infected" by the local government. The number of infections per 100,000 citizens rose to 100 and new restrictions were introduced: Masks would have to be worn in schools for upper secondary education, events with more than 25 people would have to file an application and with 50 up to 150 participants, a concept for infection prevention would be required. On 6 October some 300 infected were linked to the wedding.

In October, the city of Cologne presented its #diesmalnicht (English: #notthistime) campaign discouraging gatherings, parades and similar hazardous behaviour for the commencement of the Cologne Carnival at 11:11 a.m. on 11 November 2020. Mayor of Cologne Henriette Reker announced that there would be a ban on the sale and consumption of alcohol outside of restaurants and pubs on 11 November 2020, with many establishments voluntarily remaining closed or not selling alcohol on that date.

=== Rhineland-Palatinate ===
On 26 February, a 41-year-old soldier who worked in Cologne-Wahn military airport and had attended a carnival event in Gangelt with the 47-year-old patient from North Rhine-Westphalia was admitted to Bundeswehr Central Hospital, Koblenz, the first case in Rhineland-Palatinate.

On 27 February, a 32-year-old man from Kaiserslautern, who had been in Iran, tested positive and was admitted to Westpfalz-Klinikum.

On 4 March, a woman and a child from Wachenheim tested positive and were quarantined.

=== Saxony-Anhalt ===
On 10 March 2020, Saxony-Anhalt reported eight confirmed cases of COVID-19, making it the last federal state to be affected by the disease. As of 26 March, the subdivisions of Jessen and Schweinitz in the municipality of Jessen (Elster) are under quarantine, with no one apart from emergency workers allowed in or out. The cause is reported to be an increased number of COVID-19 infections in a retirement home there.

=== Other ===
In late March 2020, a group of patients from Lombardy in Italy and the border region of Alsace in France were treated in Germany.

==== Repatriated German citizens ====
On 1 February 2020, around 90 German citizens left Wuhan on a flight arranged by the German government. Upon arrival, they were quarantined in Rhineland-Palatinate for 14 days.

On 2 February, two of the arrivals from China tested positive and were moved from the quarantine location in Germersheim to an isolation unit at the University Hospital Frankfurt.

== Virus variants ==
The first case of what was later named the Alpha variant was confirmed by authorities on 24 December 2020. It was detected in a woman who had been travelling by plane from London to Frankfurt.

On 21 January 2021, an analysis by the Berlin Charité hospital of a coronavirus sample from a patient in a recent outbreak in Garmisch-Partenkirchen was published. The report said that, contrary to initial concerns, the sample did not show a new mutation, but rather a variant of the virus that had first been detected in March 2020. Up to the time of the report, 66 patients and staff at a hospital in Germisch-Partenkirchen had tested positive for that variant.

The first case in Germany of the Beta variant was confirmed by authorities on 22 January 2021 in a traveller who had arrived at Frankfurt airport from Brazil one day earlier. He showed no symptoms. Also on 22 January, the total death toll in Germany crossed the 50,000 mark, according to the Robert Koch Institute.

On 24 April 2021, Germany banned flights from India with effect from 26 April, due to concern about the Delta variant that had emerged in that country and was suspected to be responsible for the steep rise in COVID-19 cases there. Germans and foreigners with German residence permit, among others, would be exempt upon presentation of a negative test result before entry; a 14-day mandatory quarantine would still be required. As of 23 April, there were 21 cases of infections with the variant reported in Germany.

On 7 July 2021, the RKI announced that, based on data from 21 to 27 June, the Delta variant had become the dominant strain, making up 59 per cent of newly reported infections within that week.

By late November 2021, several cases of the Omicron variant had been reported in Germany.

After their emergence, the Alpha, Delta and Omicron variants successively went on to become the dominant strain of the coronavirus in the country.

== Vaccination ==
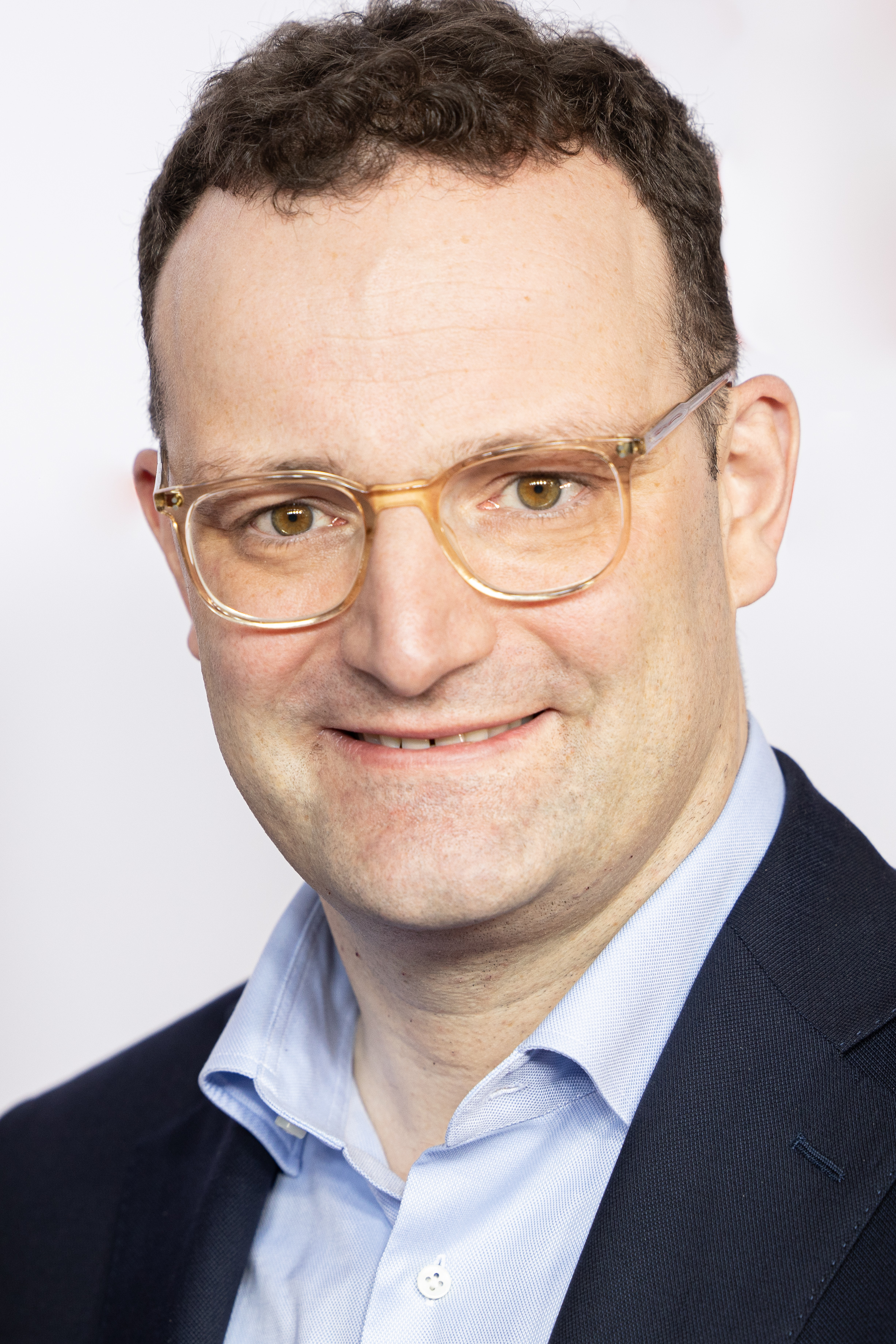
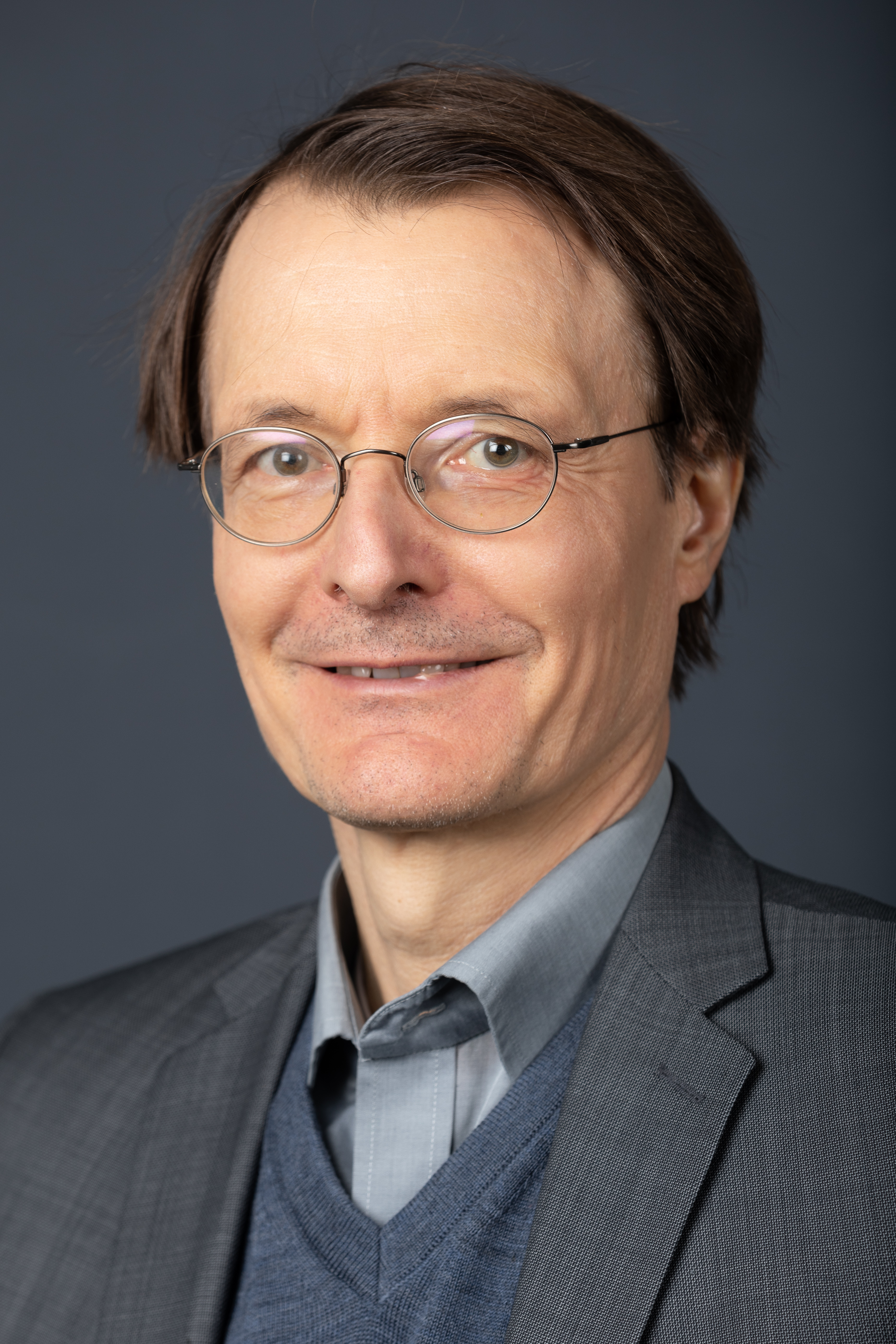
Federal Ministers of Health during the pandemic: until 8 December 2021 Jens Spahn (left) and from 8 December 2021 Karl Lauterbach (right).

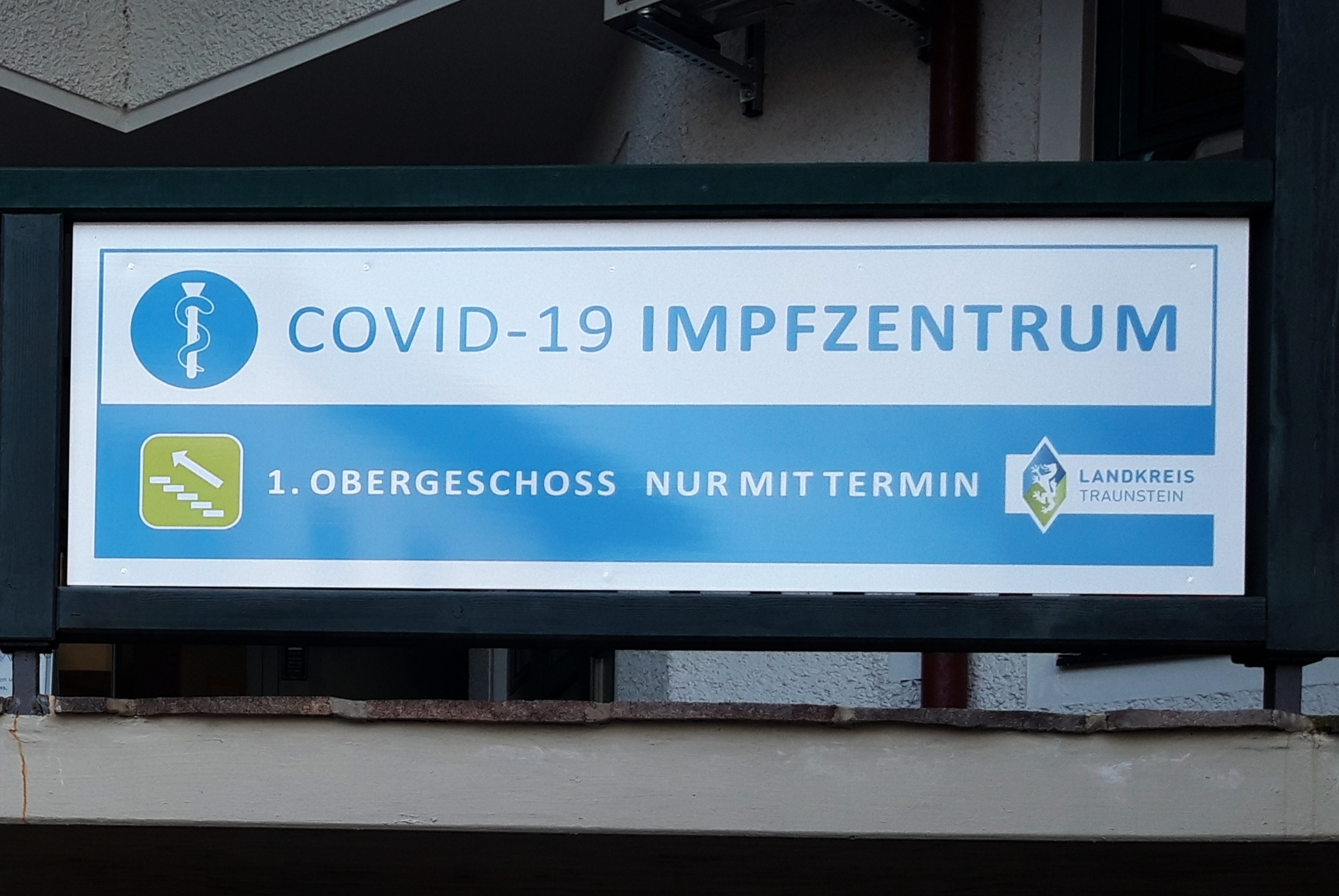
COVID-19 vaccination centre in Traunstein, Bavaria

On 9 November 2020, the German vaccination commission STIKO, an independent advisory group which is part of the RKI, published a position paper jointly with the German Ethics Council and the Leopoldina Academy of Sciences on how access to a future COVID-19 vaccine should be regulated, given that sufficient quantities of such a vaccine would not immediately be available to everybody willing to undergo vaccination. The document highlighted the need to comply with medical, legal and ethical principles, and urged for the prioritisation scheme to be made transparent to the public.

On 18 December, Health Minister Jens Spahn unveiled the government vaccination plan at a press conference. He warned that "we will have to live with this virus for a long time yet." The plan deviated from a STIKO proposal published the previous day in that it subdivided the population into three groups, instead of five as proposed by STIKO; and it allowed for priorisation within each of the groups, which Spahn defended against criticism from general practitioners and police as "allow[ing] a certain flexibility on the ground".

The first 9,750 doses of the Pfizer-BioNTech COVID-19 vaccine were delivered to Germany's 16 states on 26 December. The state of Saxony-Anhalt started vaccinations the same day, one day before the official start. The first to receive the vaccine were German residents over the age of 80, as well as caregivers and hospital staff who were considered to be at particular risk.

A first batch of the Moderna COVID-19 vaccine, of about 63,000 doses, arrived in Lower Saxony on 11 January 2021.

By early January 2021, criticism was mounting over the slow progress of the vaccination program. The government tasked the RKI with investigating if, as in other countries, the second jab could be postponed in order to use available doses for more people. On 8 January, the German Health Ministry announced that regulators of the European Medicines Agency had approved the extraction of six, instead of five, doses of Pfizer-BioNTech vaccine from each vial, and that this practice would be immediately adopted in Germany.

Production issues hampered the rollout of vaccines in the European Union and consequently also in Germany, as the country had ordered its vaccines through the bloc. On 22 January, it transpired that AstraZeneca would, after the expected approval of its vaccine by the European Union on 29 January, only be able to deliver 31 million doses, instead of the agreed 80 million doses. There were also difficulties reported with the delivery of the Pfizer-BioNTech vaccine. AstraZeneca said on 31 January that it would supply 9 million additional doses during the first quarter, while BioNTech said that its new production plant in Marburg would allow them to increase their supply to the European Union from the initially planned 1.3 billion to 2 billion.

On 3 February, Spahn said that he expected that citizens would be able to choose between the three EU-approved vaccines in a few months. He flagged that the Russian Sputnik V vaccine could be produced in Germany. Spahn had said in late January that Germany would be open to the adoption of vaccines from Russia and China after EU approval, provided that they were safe and effective.

By 10 February, the number of second vaccinations – two vaccinations being necessary for each of the three vaccines approved as of that date – had risen to above 1.1 million, comprising about 1.32 per cent of the population. Difficulties with vaccine delivery had prompted authorities to retain vaccines for use in the second vaccination and consequently, a decrease in the daily number of first vaccinations.

On 11 March, the Janssen COVID-19 vaccine was permitted for use in Germany as part of an EU permit.

By 15 March, 6,507,159 people have been given the first dose of the vaccine.

On 15 March, Germany temporarily suspended the use of the AstraZeneca vaccine "as a precaution" according to the Health Ministry, with Health Minister Spahn saying that the risk of blood clots developing after administration of the vaccine was low but could not be ruled out. While the German Medical Association supported the decision, others including epidemiologist Karl Lauterbach criticised it. Vaccinations with AstraZeneca resumed on 19 March after the European Medicines Agency deemed the vaccine "safe and effective".

On 30 March, on recommendations of Germany's vaccine panel, the use of AstraZeneca was restricted to patients 60 and older, except for patients for whom a COVID-19 infection was expected to pose a high risk, and who additionally had agreed to take the vaccine despite the small risk of serious side effects. The Vaccination Commission revised this on 22 April to allow for use in younger ages, subject to their consent to medical advice about the risks.

On 8 April, Spahn said that as the European Commission was not intending to buy the Sputnik V vaccine for the entire bloc, Germany would enter exclusive negotiations with Russia, in spite of an agreement of the bloc in early 2021 to shun exclusive negotiations with suppliers. Any purchases would be subject to approval from the European Medicines Agency.

On 6 May, the AstraZeneca vaccine was made available to all adults. Previously the vaccination campaign had considerably gained speed. On 10 May, the Johnson & Johnson vaccine was likewise made generally available. As with the AstraZeneca vaccine, a prior consultation about the risks was mandated for under 60-year olds.

Rüdiger von Kries, a member of the vaccination commission STIKO, said on 25 May that, as "practically nothing" was known about long-term adverse effects of vaccinations on 12- to 15-year-old children and adolescents, STIKO would likely recommend them only for children with other risk factors. On 10 June, STIKO made such a limited recommendation, while also saying that healthy teenagers may also be vaccinated with the consent of themselves, their parents, and doctors. In explaining the recommendation, which was more restrictive than that at EU level, STIKO head Thomas Mertens cited the concerns of von Kries, adding that very children fell ill with COVID-19 as opposed to older people. In the light of new safety data from the United States and new research on the infection risk for children and adolescents in the age range from 12 to 17 years, STIKO updated its guidance on 16 August to include a recommendation for vaccination for that age range.

A digital vaccination pass was rolled out on 10 June. Health Minister Spahn announced that day that the pass was expected to be available to everyone in Germany who is fully vaccinated, by the end of June; and that it was planned to make it an acceptable proof of vaccination status also in other countries.

On 5 August, it was reported that Germany, along with France and Israel, would give booster doses to immunocompromised patients, the very elderly and nursing home residents from September. In response to recent criticism from WHO chief Tedros Adhanom Ghebreyesus to halt boosters until at least the end of September due to global inequity in vaccine supply, the German health ministry said that it would donate at least 30 million vaccine doses to poorer countries and "support the vaccination of as many people in the world as possible".

A study by the Robert Koch Institute published on 9 August found that vaccinations had prevented an estimated 38,000 deaths from COVID-19, as well as prevented over 76,000 hospitalizations and almost 20,000 admissions to intensive care units. The study used data from the preceding six and a half months, from the approximate beginning of the third wave of the pandemic.

Health minister Spahn said on 22 September that unvaccinated workers who were forced to quarantine after returning from travels to high-risk areas would no longer receive governmental subsidies for lost income from 11 October at latest. He argued that the taxpayer could not be expected to pay for the costs incurred by those who were able to choose to get vaccinated but did not do so.

On 5 November, against the background of rapidly rising case numbers in the fourth wave of the pandemic, Health Minister Spahn said that he had agreed with state ministers to offer a third dose of the vaccine to everyone six months after their previous injection.

On 10 November, national advisory committee STIKO revised its recommendations, saying that those under 30 should only receive the Pfizer-BioNTech vaccine, as the Moderna vaccine had shown a larger incidence of heart inflammation in that age group. The Pfizer-BioNTech vaccine was also recommended as the only vaccine for pregnant women of all ages.

With the number of COVID-19 deaths passing the 100,000 mark on 25 November and the health care system being under strain from the increasing number of cases, there were increasing calls for making vaccination mandatory. Among the supporters of this step were also the state leaders Volker Bouffier and Winfried Kretschmann, and Berlin mayor Michael Müller.

== Therapy ==
On 25 January 2021, the Health Ministry announced that Germany had bought 200,000 doses of experimental antibody cocktails for €400 million, to be administered at university hospitals only, and to be used only on high-risk patients at an early stage of the illness. The drugs, Bamlanivimab and REGN-COV-2, had been used on US President Donald Trump after he caught the virus in October 2020. The use of the drugs, which had not received approval by the European Medicines Agency, was permitted under a compassionate use clause.

On 28 December 2021, the German government announced that it had ordered one million doses of Paxlovid. Health minister Lauterbach said he had liaised with the Federal Institute for Drugs and Medical Devices about emergency approval for the drug, which he expected to be granted in time for the first deliveries before the end of January 2022. Wholesale marketers started to receive the drug on 23 February. Its uptake appeared to be quite slow in the first months, however, with one German newspaper reporting that by April it had been prescribed less than 9,000 times. In a tweet on 21 May 2022, health minister Lauterbach expressed his satisfaction about new research results indicating the high efficacy of the drug, but said that more preparation was still needed to determine its "optimal use".

In January 2024, it was reported that several pharmacies in Germany were being investigated on suspicion of having illegally re-sold Paxlovid which they had ordered.

== Impact ==
=== Economy ===
Germany officially entered a recession given that its economy contracted 2.2% during the first quarter of 2020.

As of 1 April 2020, almost half a million companies in Germany had sent their workers on a government-subsidized short-time working scheme known as Kurzarbeit. The German short-time work compensation scheme is similar to schemes in France and Britain.

On 8 April, Germany reverted a travel ban for seasonal agricultural workers, allowing 80,000 Eastern Europeans to enter between April and May to harvest seasonal foods.

In a press release from 29 April, the Federal Government predicted that gross domestic product to decline by 6.3 per cent in 2020, with the sharpest drop in economic output, and the peak in Kurzarbeit short-time working, occurring in the second quarter.

On 22 May, in an article published in the Süddeutsche Zeitung, the German Council of Economic Experts stated its views on the design of the planned coronavirus recovery package. In particular, it weighed in on the debate about whether the recovery package should include a higher cash incentive for buying electric cars, a plan which the Merkel government had favoured. The Council recommended against any sector specific aid measures, and advocated focusing on investments in education and infrastructure, lowering the cost of energy, and allowing companies to balance losses with gains from previous and expected gains for future years.

On 3 June, the Bundesagentur für Arbeit (BA) announced that the jobless figure in Germany had risen in May to 2.813 million, a year-on-year increase of 577,000, bringing the unemployment rate to 6.1 per cent. In his analysis, BA director Detlef Scheele stated that even though the coronavirus crisis had hit the labour market with unprecedented severity, it was coping reasonably well in his opinion.

According to the Federal Statistical Office, exports dropped in April by 31 per cent compared to the previous year, which was unprecedented since 1950, when trade balance statistics began to be collected.

In late August 2020, the Federal Statistical Office reported a decrease in gross domestic product of 9.7% in the second quarter of 2020 as compared to the first. This was attributed to the collapse in exports as well as health protection measures during the pandemic; the latter had shut down whole industries such as those related to conferences and concerts. Economists expected a rebounding of the economy in the third quarter due to the easing of coronavirus related restrictions, but saw the possibility of a second wave of infections hanging as a threat over those predictions.

Based on preliminary calculations, the Federal Statistical Office reported on 14 January 2021 that the gross domestic product had shrunk by 5.0 per cent in 2020 as compared to the previous year. While price-adjusted private consumption had shrunk by a record 6.0 per cent, this had been partly offset by a government consumption increase of 3.4 per cent, in which the purchase of protective equipment and hospital costs had played a role. For the first time since 2011, Germany recorded a budget deficit, which at 4.8 per cent was second only to that of 1995, when the debts of the Treuhand were transferred to the federal budget.

On 26 March, the Federal Constitutional Court stopped a German law for the roll-out of an aid package totalling €750 billion that had been agreed by the European Council in summer 2020. The legal challenge had been mounted by Bernd Lucke and others, who rejected the repayment of debts in the name of all EU countries jointly. The European Commission expressed optimism that the package could still be rolled out from the end of June 2021 as planned. On 24 April, the court rejected the legal challenge. The main court proceedings were still pending.

According to a study by the Cologne Institute for Economic Research whose results were published on 20 April 2021, private consumption had dropped in 2020 by 6.1 per cent, the largest amount in 70 years, translating to €1,250 per capita. The drop was ascribed to an increased savings ratio and lower incomes during the pandemic.

=== Introduction of mask requirements ===
On 31 March, city-county Jena, Thuringia, was the first large German city to introduce an obligation to wear masks, or makeshift masks including scarves, in supermarkets, public transport, and buildings with public traffic, from 6 April, very successfully. On 2 April, the Robert Koch Institute, the federal epidemic authority, changed its previous recommendation that only people with symptoms should wear masks to also include people without symptoms. The district of Nordhausen, Thuringia, followed the example of Jena, with effect from 14 April, the city of Erfurt on 22 April.

German chancellor Merkel and state governors first gave "strong advice" to wear face masks in public starting 20 April. Saxony made it mandatory from that day, Saxony-Anhalt followed starting 23 April and (the rest of) Thuringia starting 24 April, then finally the governors agreed to make it mandatory, so most other states followed starting 27 April, except Schleswig-Holstein, which introduced requirements starting 29 April, and Berlin, where shops were initially excluded but were then included starting 29 April.

As of 24 April, most German states had no penalties for not wearing a mask. However, not wearing masks in Mecklenburg-Western Pomerania can result in a €25 fine, in Hesse a €50 fine, and in Bavaria, not wearing a face mask while on public transportation or in a shop can result in a €150 fine for first-time offenders. There are exceptions for mask wearing for young children, severely disabled persons, or with those with respiratory diseases such as asthma.

=== Mask shortage and controversies ===
In March 2020, car manufacturers announced donations of several hundred thousand masks to hospitals, and health authorities. Daimler donated 110,000 masks of their pandemic protection reserve and BMW donated 100,000 breathing masks. Volkswagen announced a donation of 200,000 masks of FFP-2 and FFP-3 types and were looking into manufacturing medical equipment parts. On 8 April, the CEO of BMW, Oliver Zipse, announced the production of FFP-2 masks both for the general public and for its workers with a target of hundred of thousands of masks each day, together with the donation to Bavaria of two million simpler masks within the following two weeks. On 28 March, more than three million protective masks bought by Volkswagen arrived at Frankfurt airport from Shanghai. They were the first shipment of a larger donation of medical equipment worth 40 million euros which were brought to hospitals and federal agencies in Hesse and Lower Saxony.

On 30 March, Deutsche Bank donated 375,000 surgical masks that they had acquired during the SARS epidemic.

In April, a German company placed an online order for 10 million masks, valued at €15 million, to a fraudulently cloned website of a Dutch supply company. Irish Garda Síochána and Dutch authorities recovered €880,000 from a Dutch account and €498,000 from a Nigerian account, both tied to the scam.

On 3 April, Berlin's Senator of the Interior Andreas Geisel accused the United States agents of appropriating a shipment of 200,000 3M-made face masks meant for Berlin police from the airport in Bangkok. Andreas Geisel considered it an "act of modern piracy", SPD acting chairman Rolf Mützenich asked for an investigation and a response from the government, and Berlin mayor Michael Müller blamed Trump for it and called it "inhuman and unacceptable". However, these claims were rejected by 3M officials, who stated that they have "no records of an order for respiratory masks from China for the Berlin police" and Berlin police later admitted the shipment was not seized by U.S. authorities, but was believed to have been bought at a better price, possibly by a German merchant or China. As a result, Berlin opposition member Burkard Dregger accused the Berlin senate of deception for the purpose of covering up their failure to provide the masks. Politico Europe reported that "the Berliners are taking a page straight out of the Trump playbook and not letting facts get in the way of a good story."

German officials reported that U.S. buyers were paying far above the market price and were outbidding European buyers for masks.

In early March 2021, members of the German parliament Nikolas Löbel and Georg Nüßlein resigned from the ruling CDU/CSU party over a scandal that had broken about them having allegedly earned six-figure sums from brokering sales contracts for face masks. Löbel also resigned from the parliament. Later Alfred Sauter, a lawmaker in the Bavarian state parliament, was embroiled in the same scandal and resigned from the CSU. The scandal (which came to be known as Maskenaffäre, "mask affair" in Germany) led to a public discussion on transparency and ethics for such dealings. In response to the scandal, the CDU/CSU party tightened its pertaining rules. The previous day, it had performed poorly at two state elections, which observers saw as being connected to the loss in popularity due to the scandal. In November 2021, the Oberlandesgericht in Munich cleared Nüßlein and Sauter of corruption accusations, arguing that the two had not acted in their parliamentary roles, but instead had made use of their authorities and contacts, to which situation the relevant corruption law did not apply. Löbel had already been cleared of the accusations in July.

Over the weekend of 5 and 6 June, German weekly Der Spiegel reported that uncertified face masks from a burst of orders in early 2020 had been considered by the Health Ministry for distribution among the homeless and those with disabilities. In a press statement on 6 June, Health Minister Spahn sharply rebuked accusations that he had intended to distribute inferior masks to vulnerable groups as "outrageous", saying that the masks in question had been thoroughly tested and fulfilled all the necessary safety requirements. Nevertheless, within less than a week, the controversy grew to be regarded as the main friction point in the ruling Grand coalition as the country was approaching the 2021 German federal election in late September. A Tagesschau analysis pointed out that there were two different standards for medical and labour products; and that it remained unclear whether the masks were actually able to reliably protect their wearer.

=== Consumer good shortages ===
On 29 February 2020, it was reported that supermarket chains, such as Aldi and Lidl, had seen an increase in demand, particularly for tinned food, noodles, toilet paper (whose sales rose by 700% from February to March) and disinfectants. The Ministry of Health of North Rhine-Westphalia advised against panic buying, especially of masks, medications and disinfectants, to leave them for those really in need, assuring there would be no shortage of supply even in the event of a quarantine. A day earlier, after recent drastic price hikes and shortages especially of masks, medications and disinfectants which were the result of a steep increase in demand, calls had been made to consumers to leave these products for hospitals and medical practices.

== Protests against government-imposed restrictions; anti-vaccination ==
Since April 2020, several protests have been held in Germany in response to the COVID-19 pandemic. While the initial cause for the protests were governmental measures to combat the pandemic, in particular the lockdown that had been imposed in March and the mask requirement that came into force in late April, they were also fuelled by negative sentiments regarding a future coronavirus vaccine that the German government – as others in the world – portrayed as the conclusive way out of the pandemic. The vaccination sceptics, or "anti-vaxxers", built in part on beliefs of Anthroposophic medicine.

As of May 2020, only a minority of the German population (an estimated 3%) completely rejected any vaccinations, and the percentage of people who responded in May they would take a COVID-19 vaccine was higher compared to the United States (63% in Germany vs 55% in the US). However, that number was down 16 per cent from the month before, where 79% were sure about getting vaccinated. German health officials and other experts have expressed concerns that the pandemic might allow Germany's anti-vaccination movement to grow its support base.

Apart from a common belief that the government measures were a strongly disproportionate diminishing of constitutional basic rights, the aims of the protesters varied widely: what was described as a "bizarre mix of people" included conspiracy theorists, radical extremists, antisemites, football hooligans and anti-vaxxers as well as "hippie moms" and advocates of alternative medicine. Many protesters vented their anger at Chancellor Merkel, Health Minister Spahn and virologist Drosten. The ire of the protesters also regularly targeted Bill Gates, who they suspected to intend to implant microchips for manipulative purposes through a future COVID-19 vaccination. Some protesters likened themselves to the persecuted in Nazi Germany, which led to strong rebukes by politicians.

Weekly rallies which became known as Hygienedemos (hygiene demonstrations) established themselves in several cities including Berlin, Leipzig, Munich, Frankfurt and Stuttgart. The Hygienedemo in Berlin on 25 April 2020 attracted around 1,000 participants. During May, attendance at the Hygienedemos generally decreased sharply. Observers attributed this to a variety of factors, including the relaxation of the lockdown, and a high level of satisfaction in the general population about the government's handling of the crisis. Another factor was considered to be the participation of the right-wing Alternative for Germany (AfD), and on some occasions, violent or extreme right-wing individuals sprouting conspiracy theories, including vegan chef Attila Hildmann, at rallies. Hildmann was apprehended by police in Berlin in July 2020 and charged with Volksverhetzung.

A resurgence of protests occurred from mid-year as cases began to rise again and the government considered a second lockdown. The group Querdenken emerged as the main force in organising protests in Stuttgart – giving rise to the name Querdenken 711, after the dialling code of the city – and other cities. Two separate rallies on 29 August 2020 drew a total of around 38,000 participants, with police making around 300 arrests. The protest drew particular attention for the attempted storming of the Reichstag, which houses the German parliament, by several hundred people, some of whom were holding insignia from the Reichsbürger movement. There were increasing concerns that the rallies were becoming a platform for far-right, and even extremist, views.

After a hiatus in large protests spanning several months, a protest in Kassel on 20 March 2021 drew over 20,000 attendants; violent scuffles with police occurred that day. As the third wave of the pandemic receded between April and June 2021, protests became smaller; politologist Josef Holnburger said to broadcaster MDR that a downward trend in followership of social media channels of the Querdenken movement had been observed by him and colleagues as early as November 2020, which they related to repeated failures of setting up large street demonstrations since that time. Holnburger expressed worries about radicalization of parts of the chats he observed, however.

On 18 September 2021, a radicalized opponent of the measures to contain the pandemic fatally shot a 20-year-old student working at a gas station in Idar-Oberstein. The student had refused to sell beer to the 49-year-old perpetrator as he was not wearing a mask. The perpetrator left the gas station, only to return some time later with a gun and shot the cashier in the head. After turning himself in to police, he stated that he "wanted to set an example". The act was condemned by broad sections of the media, politics and the population, while the increasingly radicalizing corona deniers and corona gamblers celebrated the perpetrator and the act in their areas of retreat on the Internet. Chancellor Angela Merkel called the act "heinous". The three main contenders in the federal elections on 26 September all expressed their shock at the killing. Minister for Justice Christine Lambrecht said that the country had to "counter the radicalisation of coronavirus deniers who are willing to use violence with all possible means".

== See also ==
- 2020 in Germany
- COVID-19 pandemic death rates by country
- COVID-19 pandemic in Europe
- COVID-19 pandemic by country and territory
- National responses to the COVID-19 pandemic
