= University Hospital of Düsseldorf =

Hospital in Germany

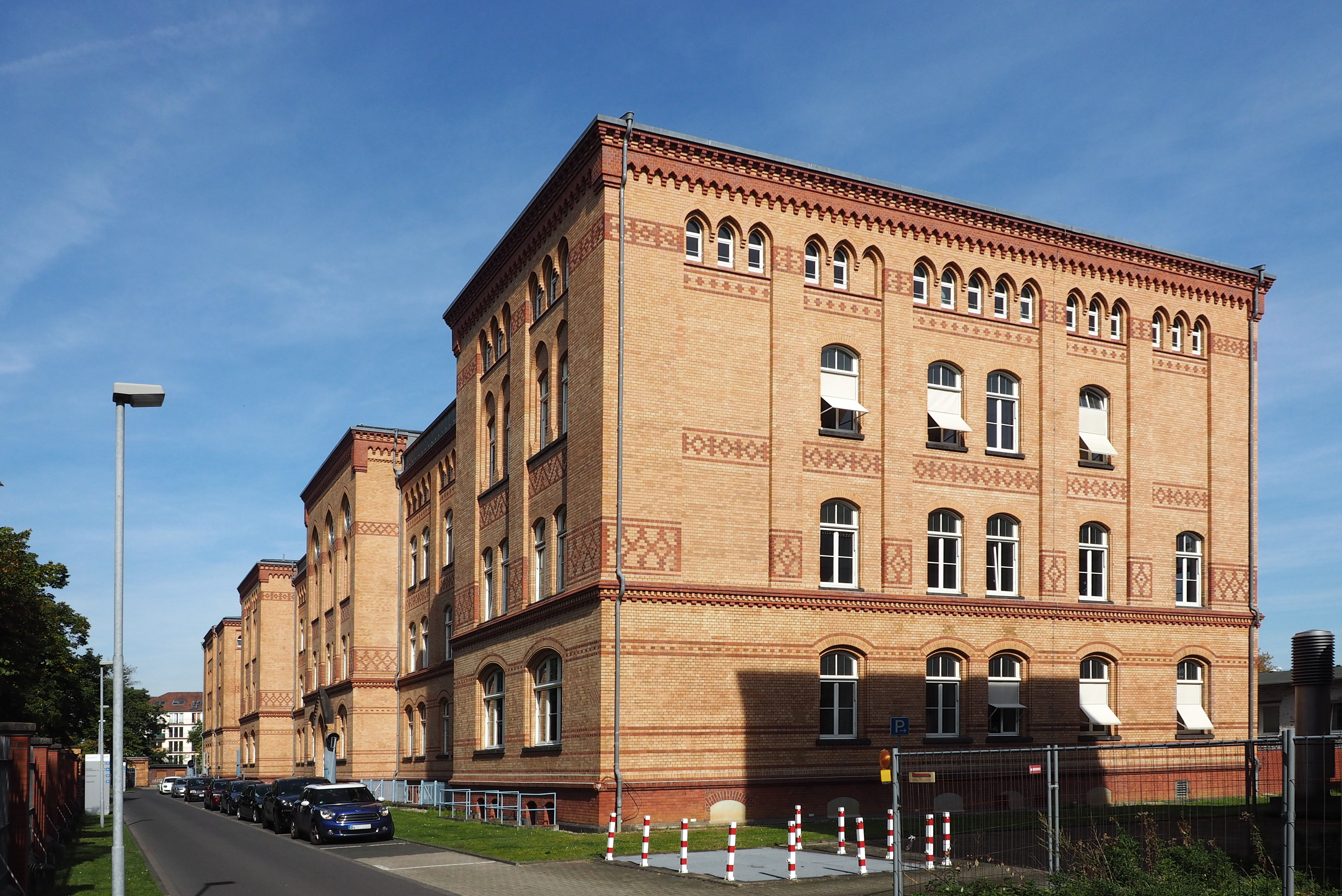

Geography
- Location: Düsseldorf
- Coordinates: 51°11′50″N 6°47′22″E

Organisation
- Care system: Public healthcare
- Affiliated university: Heinrich Heine University, Düsseldorf

Services
- Standards: Very high
- Beds: 1200

Helipads
- Helipad: Yes

History
- Construction started: 1907

Links
- Website: https://www.uniklinik-duesseldorf.de/

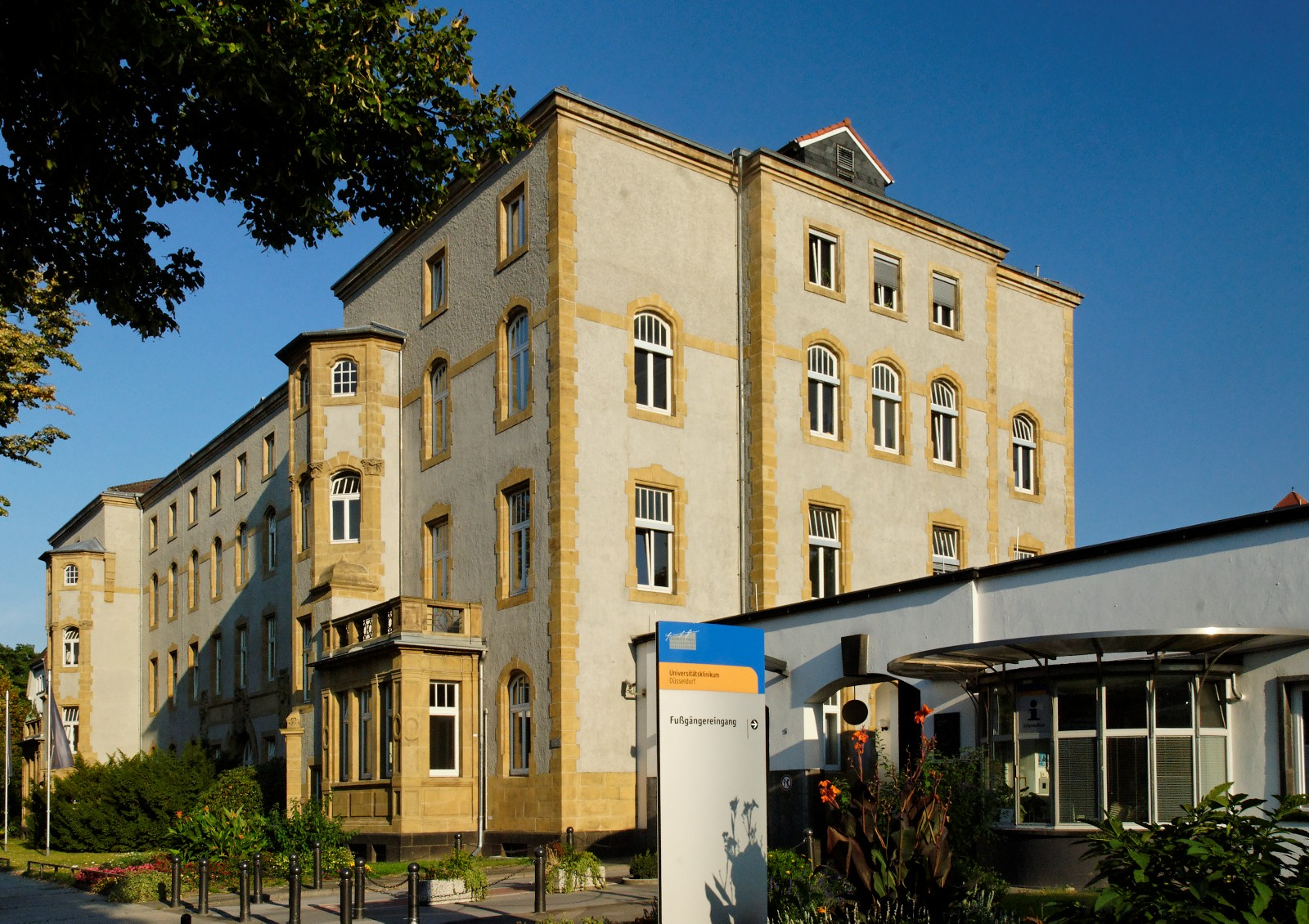
Entrance to one of the hospital's facilities

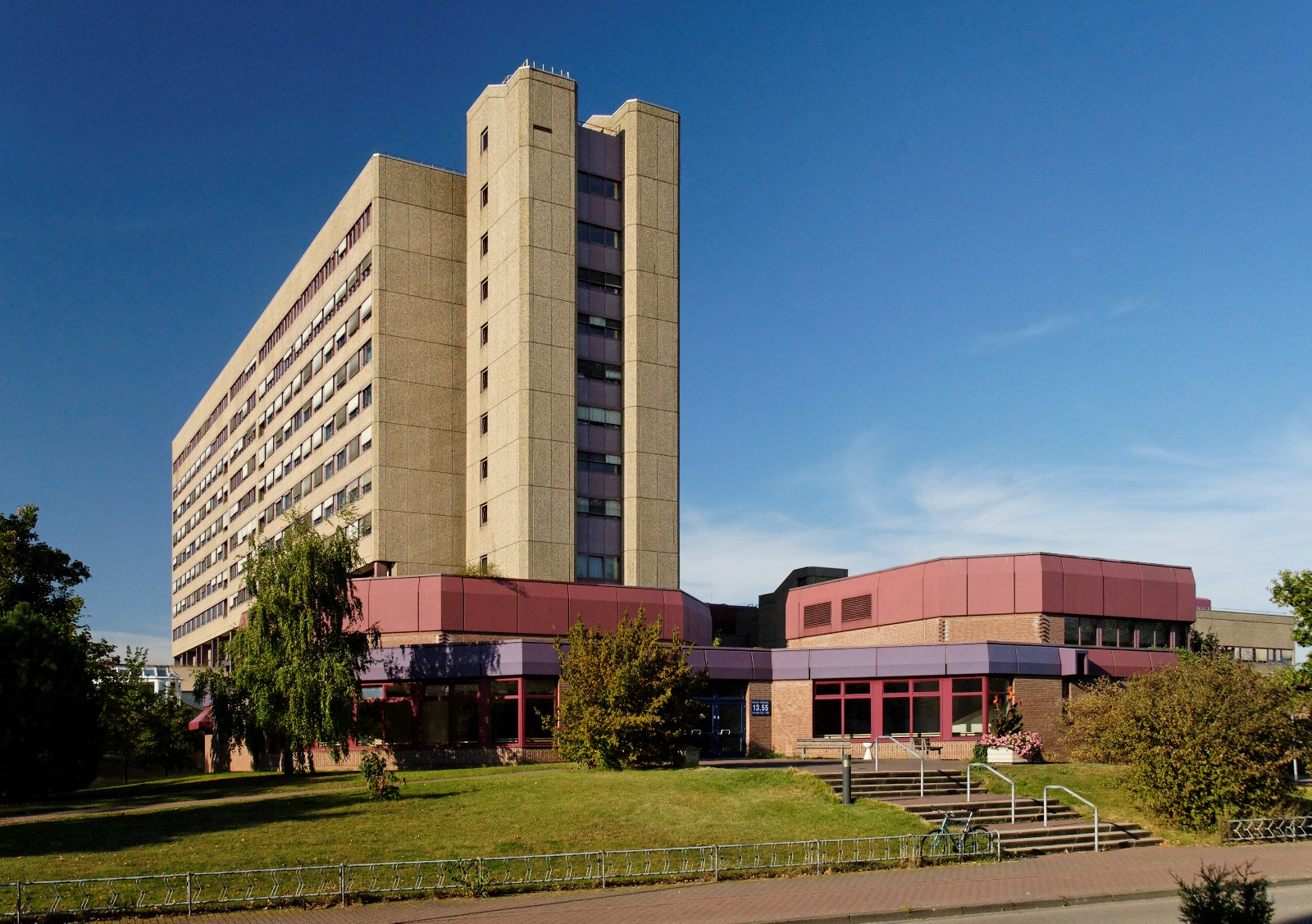
The MNR-Klinik

The University Hospital of Düsseldorf (German: Universitätsklinikum Düsseldorf) is the medical department of the Heinrich Heine University of Düsseldorf. It is located in the south of Düsseldorf, the state capital of the German state of North Rhine-Westphalia and center of the populous Rhine-Ruhr metropolitan region. It treats approximately 45,000 inpatients and 300,000 outpatients every year in 32 clinics and 34 institutes. The hospital has more than 1,200 inpatient beds. It has roughly 5,500 employees, including 1,300 nurses and 800 physicians. Many facilities are run in-house (e.g. training centers). The board consists of the medical director, the commercial director, the director of nursing and the dean of the medical faculty.

== History ==
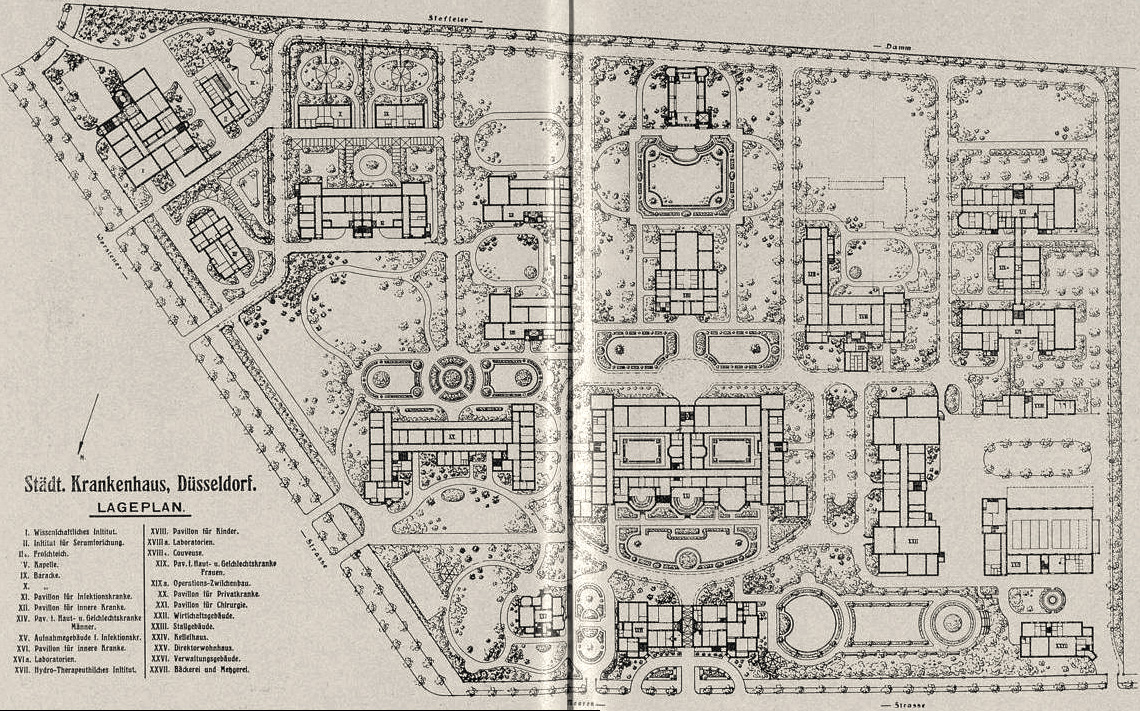
Site plan of the general municipal hospitals, 1907

On July 27, 1907, the general municipal hospitals and subsequently the Düsseldorf Academy for Practical Medicine were officially opened. Oskar Witzel was appointed director. On the site were the clinics for surgery, internal medicine pediatrics, with Arthur Schloßmann as head physician, gynecology and obstetrics with Hugo Sellheim as head physician, infectious diseases with an attached institute for experimental therapy, skin and venereal diseases, ear, nose and throat medicine, ophthalmology and pathology under the direction of Lubarsch. The psychiatric ward was located in the Rhenish Provincial and Nursing Home in Grafenberg.

After the Second World War, the clinic and the academy gained a worldwide reputation in heart research, especially when in 1952 the heart surgeon and head of the surgical clinic from 1946 to 1969, Ernst Derra, performed the first open heart operation using a heart-lung machine . In 1958, the new surgical clinic building, at that time one of the most modern clinic buildings in the world, was opened.

After the medical academy was merged into the newly founded University of Düsseldorf in 1965, on January 1, 1973, the state of North Rhine-Westphalia also took over ownership of the hospitals, which were renamed the Düsseldorf University Hospital at that time. The University of Düsseldorf has now moved into the first new buildings on the campus south of the clinic site. From 1973 onward, the pre-clinic and other medical institutes were also located here. The facilities, which were primarily used for clinical care and research, remained on the hospital grounds.

A comprehensive modernization of the clinics began in 1985 with the opening of the newly built Medical-Neurological-Radiological Clinic (MNR Clinic), which also includes the clinic's tallest building. This was followed by the construction of a new center for child and adolescent medicine on and around the site of the old children's clinic. The modernization process included the new data center at the site of the old boiler house.

After a long construction period, the Center for Operative Medicine II was opened in June 2014 as the new center of the clinic. The clinics for ENT, neurosurgery, maxillofacial and facial plastic surgery, accident and hand surgery and orthopedics were integrated into it. It includes operating rooms, hospital wards including an intensive care unit and the new central emergency room with shock rooms and a helicopter roof landing pad. The opening was originally planned for 2009, but commissioning was not possible due to problems with fire protection. The media called the facility a "ghost clinic." Legal disputes have been announced regarding the executing company Imtech.

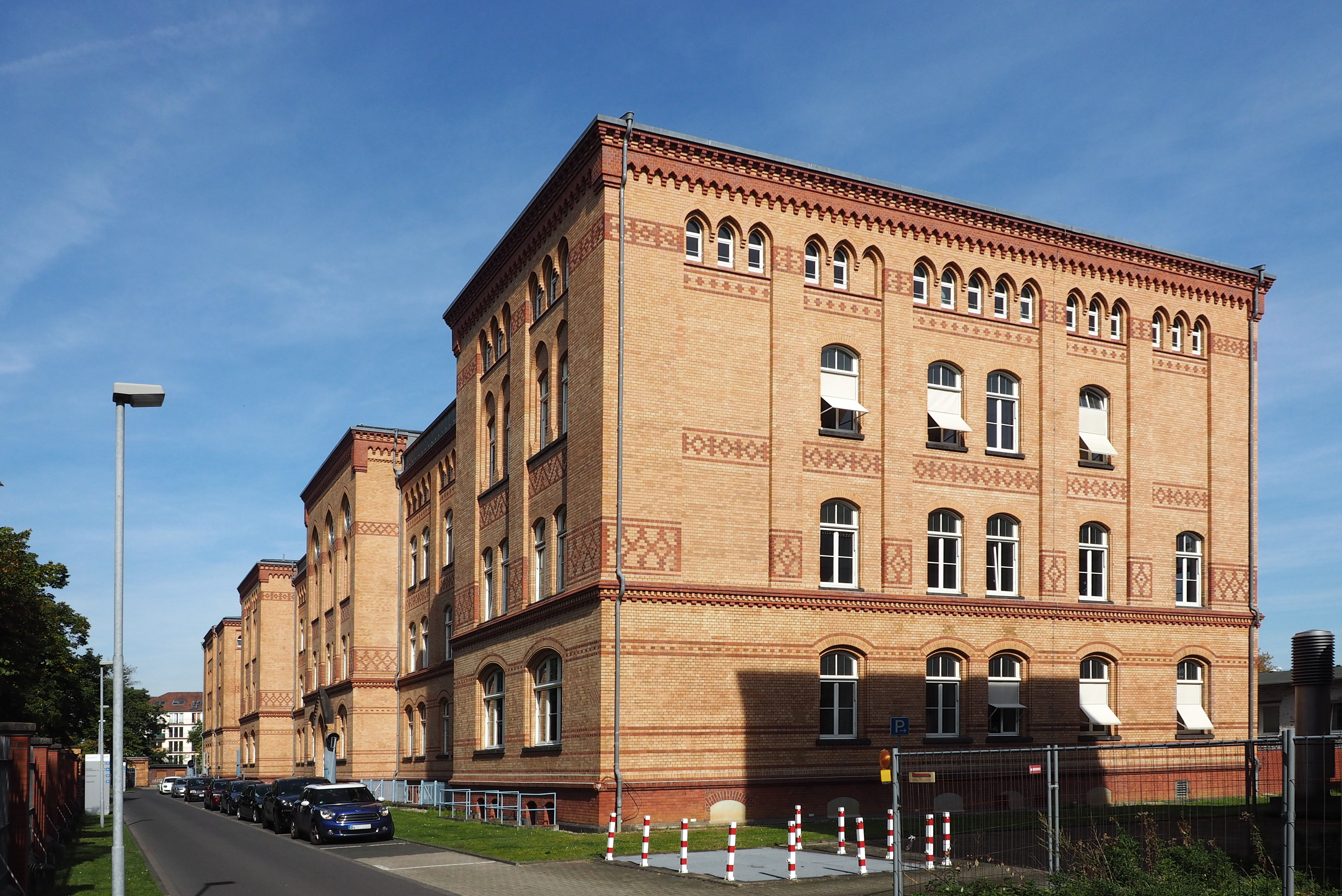
Gebäude der Kieferklinik

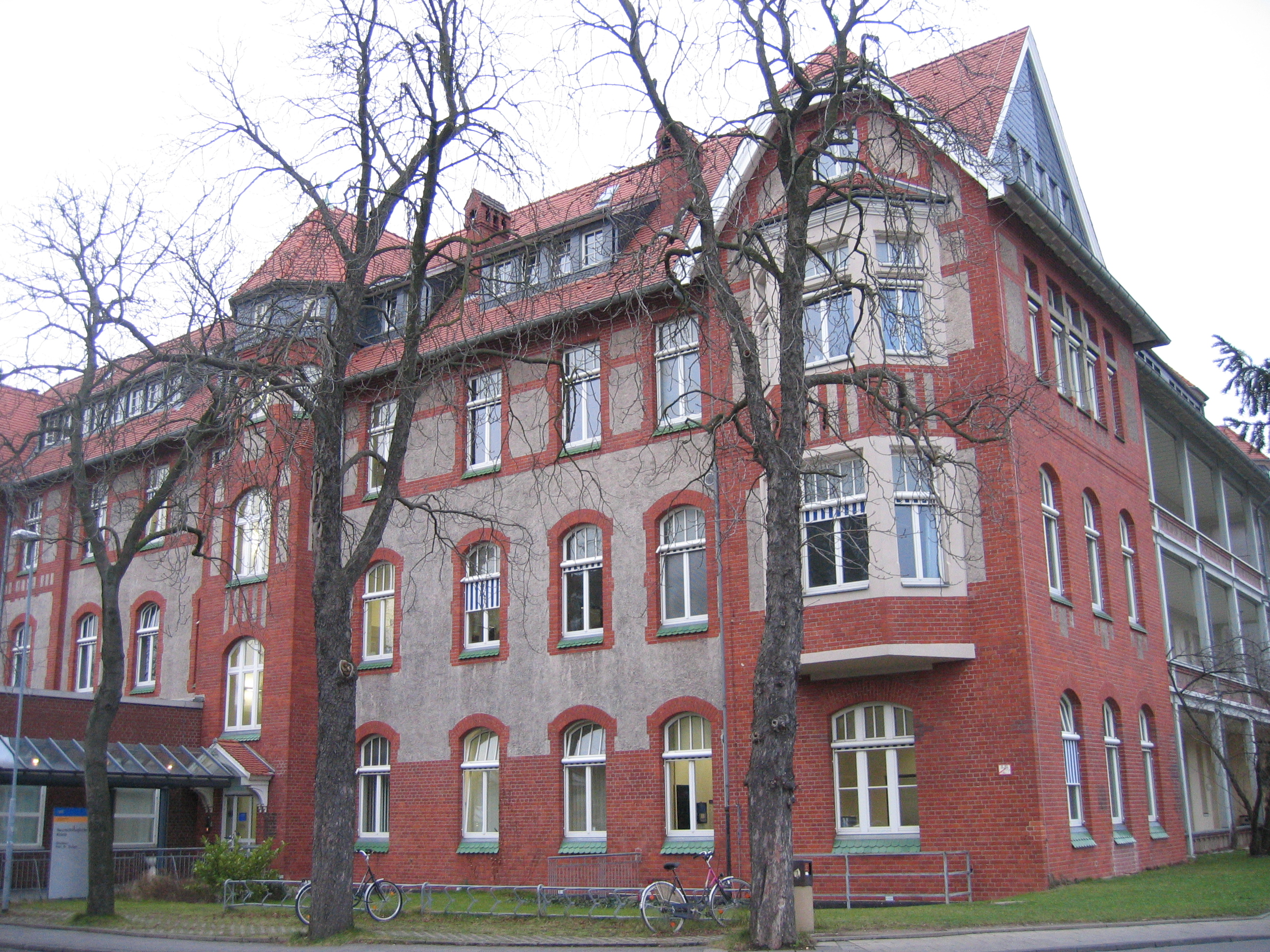
Gebäude der Urologischen Klinik

In September 2020, the university clinic was attacked by hackers; As a result, the clinic's computer and IT system failed. After the attack, the emergency room was forced to close and an emergency patient who had to be diverted to another hospital died. The North Rhine-Westphalia Cybercrime Central and Contact Office took over the investigation.

As part of the "Giga for Health" innovation project, Düsseldorf's University Hospital will become the first 5G medical campus in Europe.

== Ranking ==
The Gastroenterology Clinic is ranked among the best 17 clinics in the world by Newsweek magazine. The German Cancer Aid included the university hospital in its list of top oncology centers for the first time in 2013. This is associated with funding from the University Tumor Center Düsseldorf (UTZ) totaling three million euros for three years.

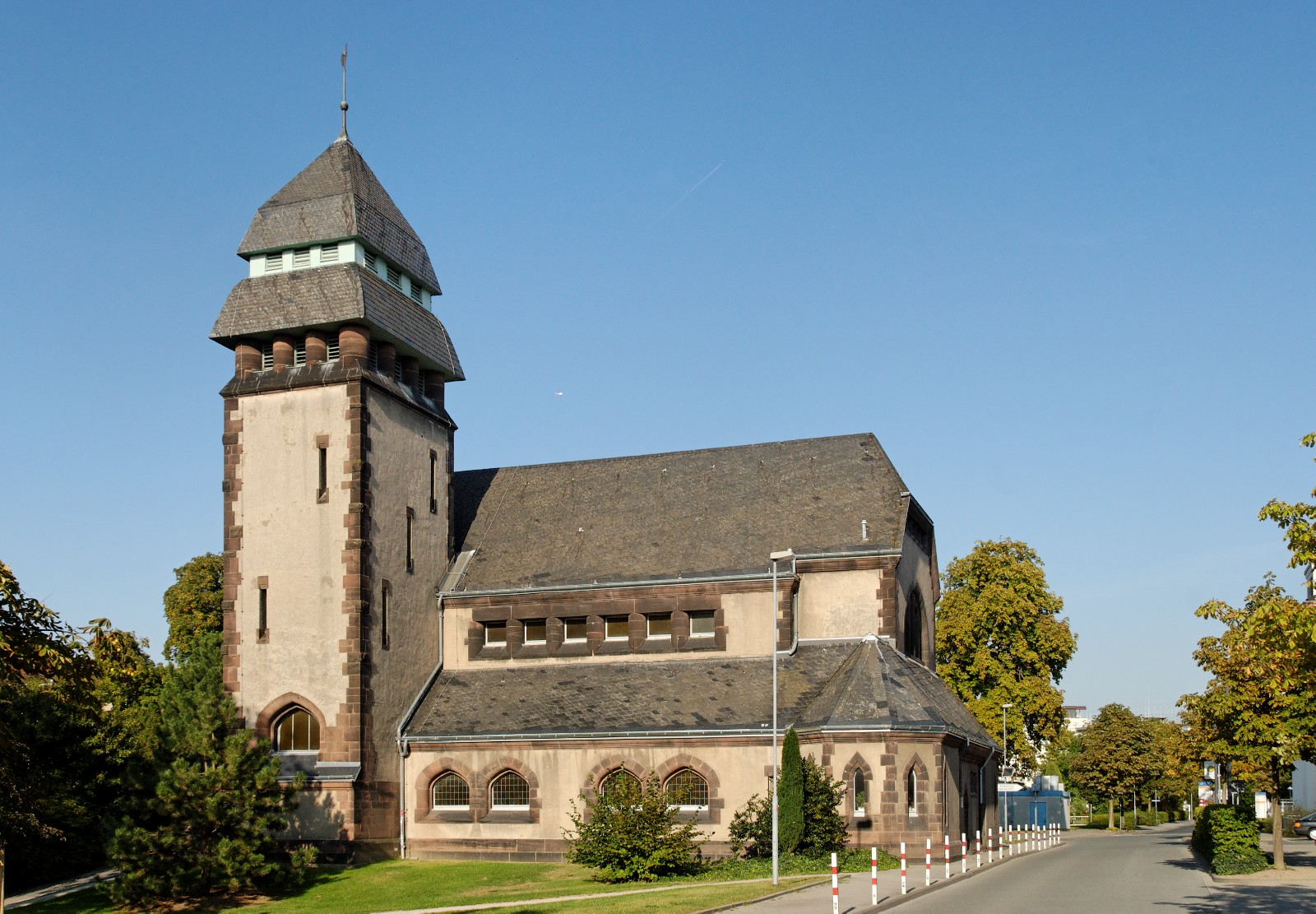
Holy Spirit Chapel

== Location ==
The fenced-in 40-hectare site is located in the southeast of the Düsseldorf district of Bilk. The northern border is formed by Moorenstrasse and Witzelstrasse. Himmelgeister Straße is to the west and Christophstraße to the east of the site. To the south is the campus of the Heinrich Heine University - separated from the clinic site by the A 46, which runs here in the university tunnel, and a green corridor with footpaths and cycle paths above the tunnel.

== See also ==
- Universitäts-Augenklinik Düsseldorf
- University of Düsseldorf
