= Dermatochalasis =

Excess of skin in the upper or lower eyelid

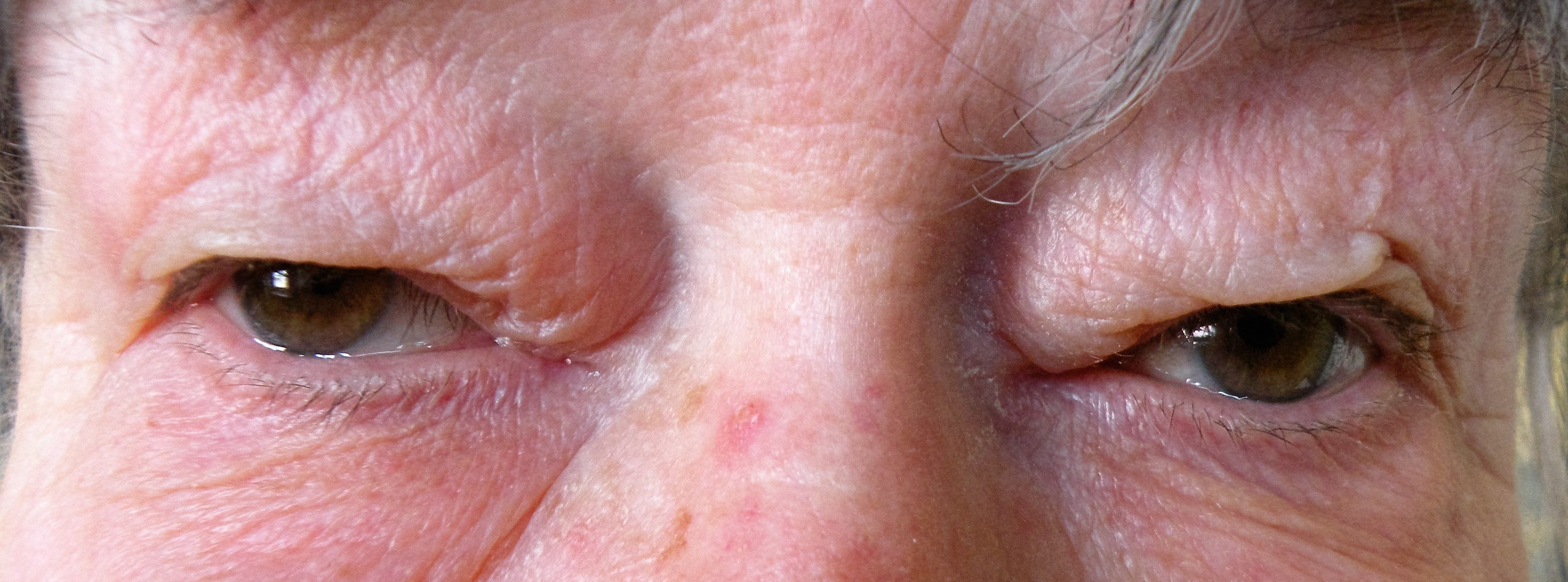
- Dermatochalasis in an elderly woman
- Specialty: Medical genetics

Dermatochalasis is a medical condition, defined as an excess of skin in the upper or lower eyelid, also known as "baggy eyes." It may be either an acquired or a congenital condition. It is generally treated with blepharoplasty.

== Presentation ==
=== Associated conditions ===
People with dermatochalasis often also have blepharitis, a condition caused by the plugging of glands in the eye that produce lubricating fluid (meibomian glands). Dermatochalasis can be severe enough that it pushes the eyelashes into the eye, causing entropion.

Weakness in the orbital septum may cause the herniation of the orbital fat pads. This is observed as the presence of bulges (fat pads) in the soft tissue of the baggy eyes.

It can also be observed in various hereditary connective tissue disorders, including classical Ehlers-Danlos syndrome and cutis laxa.

Dermatochalasis can be a major contributing factor for headaches due to tonic reflex contraction of muscles in an attempt to compensate, which then causes tension-type headaches.

== Pathophysiology ==
Dermatochalasis is caused by a loss of elasticity in the connective tissue supporting the structure of the front portion of the eyelid. Normally, in Caucasians, the orbicularis muscle and overlying skin form a crease near the tarsal border. In dermatochalasis, the excess tissues hangs down, over the front edge of the eyelid. The excess tissue can sometimes obstruct the visual field, especially the superior visual field. In severe cases, it may obstruct as much as 50 percent of the superior visual field.

== Treatment ==
If dermatochalasis is severe enough to obstruct the peripheral or superior visual fields, then it may be treated with a surgical procedure called blepharoplasty. In blepharoplasty surgery, excess skin, muscle and fat are removed. While the improvement of vision is an indication for blepharoplasty on the superior eyelid, if the visual fields are not obstructed, it may be performed for cosmetic reasons. In general, blepharoplasty of the inferior eyelid is considered cosmetic, as dermatochalasis in the lower eyelid does not interfere with vision.

== Epidemiology ==
Dermatochalasis commonly affects the elderly, although sometimes it is congenitally acquired. The elderly version may begin to develop as early as 40 years of age, and it continues to progress with age. The congenital version may begin around 20 years of age. There is no racial predisposition towards developing dermatochalasis, and men and women are equally affected.

== See also ==
- Cutis laxa
- Ptosis
