= Eyelid revision =

Surgery to correct previous eyelid surgery issues

Eyelid revision is a procedure that involves correcting or addressing any issues that have arisen from a previous eyelid surgery. The surgery is more difficult to perform and is more complicated than an initial eyelid revision surgery, since the site of the procedure has been operated on before. The reasons for eyelid revision surgeries include contour abnormalities, asymmetry and unusually high eyelid height. The procedure is known to have more complications and issues than initial eyelid surgeries due to the presence of excess scar tissue at the surgery site.

== Contour abnormalities ==
Contour abnormalities are also a common cause of eyelid revision surgery. Contour abnormalities are often the result of poor wound closure during the procedure.

== Asymmetry ==
One of the most frequent complications that arise from an initial eyelid surgery is asymmetry, which are often a result of poor markings by the surgeon prior to operation.

== Unnaturally high eyelid height ==
Unusually high eyelid heights can make the results of an original eyelid revision procedure appear unnatural. Thus, an initial blepharoplasty may need revision if there is an unusually high eyelid height that is formed.

== Ptosis ==
One of the most troublesome complications of initial eyelid surgery is the surgeon discovering the patient has ptosis or a "drooping" eyelid after the surgery has been performed. It is also possible for a patient to develop ptosis as a result of an initial eyelid surgery operation. Both require eyelid revision surgeries. Since ptosis patients need correction of delicate anatomical tissues and structures, eyelid revision surgery on ptosis patients is considered one of the more difficult surgical procedures to perform.
