= Combined pulmonary fibrosis and emphysema =

- Other names: CPFE
- Specialty: Pulmonology

Combined pulmonary fibrosis and emphysema (CPFE), describes a medical syndrome involving both pulmonary fibrosis and emphysema. The combination is most commonly found in male smokers. Pulmonary function tests typically show preserved lung volume with very low transfer factor.

== Presentation ==
CFPE is characterised by shortness of breath, and reduced oxygen concentration (reflecting gas exchange abnormalities). Imaging shows upper-lobe emphysema, and lower-lobe interstitial fibrosis. CFPE is often complicated by pulmonary hypertension, acute lung injury, lung cancer, and coronary artery disease.

== Diagnosis ==
The diagnosis is confirmed with high resolution CT scan.
