= Orbital emphysema =

- Other names: Pneumo-orbit
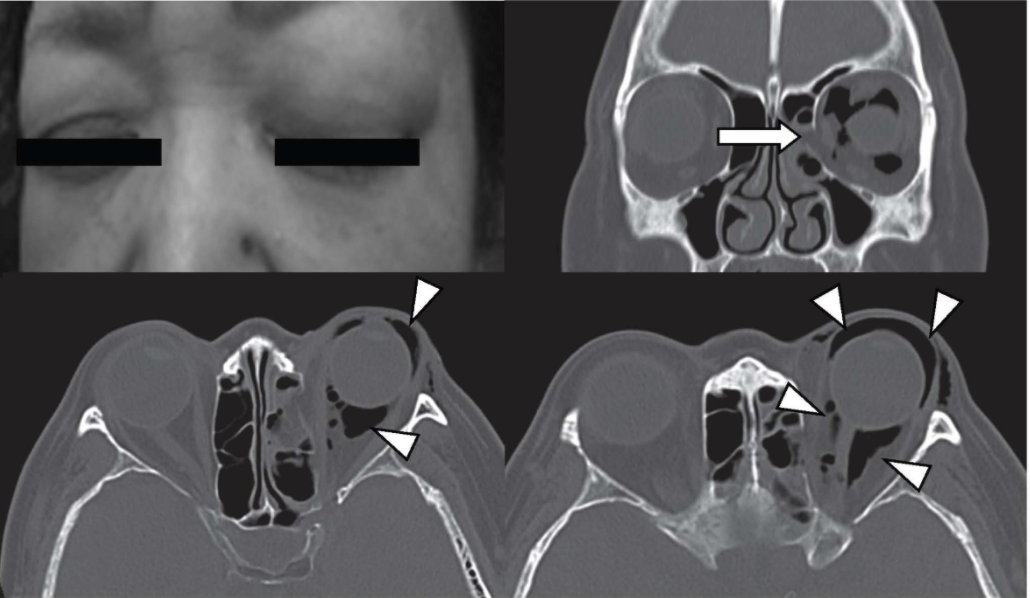
- Woman with preorbital swelling in orbital emphysema shown in CT scans
- Pronunciation: /ˈɔː(r)bɪt(ə)l ˌemfɪˈsiːmə/
- Specialty: Ophthalmology
- Symptoms: Swelling, bruising, globe dystopia, diplopia, restrict ocular motility, prohibit eyelid closure, loss of sensation over the upper cheek area, nausea, dizziness, vomiting, bradycardia, syncope, heart block
- Complications: Proptosis, visual impairment, central retinal artery occlusion, compressive optic neuropathy, orbital compartment syndrome.
- Duration: 7-10 Days
- Causes: sneezing, nose blowing, or coughing in patients with trauma, postoperative complications, infections
- Diagnostic method: Based on medical history, computer tomography, and physical examination
- Differential diagnosis: Palpebral emphysema, true orbital emphysema, orbitopalperbal emphysema
- Treatment: No treatment for stage I and II, lateral canthotomy or cantholysis, orbital decompression by needle aspiration, and bone decompression for stage III and IV orbital emphysema

Orbital emphysema (/ˈɔː(r)bɪt(ə)l ˌemfɪˈsiːmə/, also known as pneumo-orbit) is a medical condition that refers to the trapping of air within the loose subcutaneous around the orbit that is generally characterized by sudden onset swelling and bruising at the impacted eye, with or without deterioration of vision, which the severity depends on the density of air trapped under the orbital soft tissue spaces.

It is most commonly result from forceful sneezing, nose blowing, or coughing among patients with a history of periorbital trauma or orbital fractures that happened several hours-days in advance. Rare occasions have also been reported in relation to individuals with no traumatic past events that include: infection, esophageal rupture, postoperative complications, pulmonary barotrauma, with the same predisposing factors (sneezing, nose blowing, or coughing). A four-stage system of orbital emphysema was developed for severity classification. Clinical diagnosis can be made based on a combination of medical history, physical examination, and computed tomography. There are three kinds of orbital emphysema including palpebral emphysema, true orbital emphysema, and orbitopalpebral emphysema.

Orbital emphysema on its own is a mild and self-limiting disease, and usually requires no treatment. If related visual symptoms or other acute orbital compression symptoms are present, lateral canthotomy or cantholysis, orbital decompression by needle aspiration, and bone decompression may be required to relieve orbital pressure and preserve vision.

== Signs and symptoms ==
The signs and symptoms of orbital emphysema vary depending on the original cause, but it is preliminary associated with swelling, bruising, and tenderness around the impacted eye. It may also involve proptosis or the deterioration of vision, typically diplopia. The entrapped air may cause an acute increase in the intraocular pressure or vascular compromise that restrict ocular motility, prohibit the closure of eyelids, and the loss of sensation over the upper cheek areas.

Server entrapment in the soft tissues tends to stimulate oculocardiac reflex, which is likely to generate significant vagal responses including nausea, dizziness, vomiting, bradycardia, syncope and heart block. Without treating it promptly may subsequently result in compromisation of ocular function and visual impairment.

== Cause ==
=== Trauma ===
Blunt trauma caused by a direct blow at the orbital is the major leading cause of orbital emphysema. Any object with force and/or speed, typically a ball, fist or vehicle accidents, can result in orbital floor and/or medial wall fractures. These disruptions permit air entry into the orbital subcutaneous from the sinus, with a one-way check valve mechanism that forbids the air from exiting. Victims are often found in sport-related concussion, automobile vehicle accidents, or snowboarding accidents.

Traumatic injuries do not cause onset swelling unless there is a forceful injection of air from vigorous sneezing, nose-blowing, or coughing. These generate an acute increase in intraorbital pressure, compromising the intraorbital neurovascular structures, which subsequently trigger the development of orbital emphysema.

=== Postoperative complications ===
Orbital emphysema is a common result of certain types of surgery, in particular the ones that involve orbital medial wall. It may also occur in other oral, nasal, and maxillofacial surgical interventions, in which the occurrence is unexpected. They can weaken sinuses, bony structure, induce deep orbital tissue damages, or globe perforation that cause air leakage into the periorbital soft tissues and superiorly into the supraorbital fat. These surgical procedures may possibly introduce staphylococci, streptococci, and anaerobic bacteria via a compromised bony wall that can cause periorbital infection. The corresponding weakened or degenerated tissues cannot withstand the sudden increase in intraocular pressure and impaired ocular perfusion, driven by severe coughing or sneezing. It subsequently results in air trapped in the periorbital subcutaneous tissue and the development of orbital emphysema, which is often mistaken as allergic reactions. Without proper management can lead to cardiac life-threatening conditions such as cardiopulmonary embolism, cardiac tamponade, and respiratory distress, depending on the volume of air trapped under the facial soft tissues.

=== Infection ===
Infections can spread beyond their initial location, including lamina papyracea.

== Pathophysiology ==
Orbital emphysema occurs following forceful injection of air into the soft tissues of the orbit through a breach in one of the orbital walls which is typically associated with orbital fracture after blunt trauma, or less frequently with compressed air injuries, tumours and infections of the sinonasal region or complications after surgery.

Orbital emphysema develops after an orbital fracture in a three-step process. After the fracture has occurred on one of the orbital walls, a sino-orbital communication is established. The communication will allow air to be forced from the sinuses into the orbit in the presence of a pressure gradient from forceful expiratory efforts, nose-blowing or even a sneeze. Orbital emphysema is typically a harmless disorder because air escapes as quickly as it enters the fracture site, and the increase in intraorbital pressure is usually transient, lasting for as long as the sneeze or nose blowing. However, when orbital soft tissues, such as fat, falls back on the sino-orbital communication, a one-way ball valve will be created, leading to the entrapment of air. When sufficient air accumulates, it will result in acute compartment syndrome and vascular compromise, causing complications including proptosis, visual impairment, central retinal artery occlusion, compressive optic neuropathy, and other severe complications caused by orbital compartment syndrome.

There are three variations of orbital emphysema, namely palpebral emphysema, true orbital emphysema, and orbitopalpebral emphysema.

=== Palpebral emphysema ===
Palpebral emphysema refers to emphysema of the eyelids alone. It is a rare kind of orbital emphysema which is usually caused by fractures of the lacrimal bone. The lacrimal sac ruptures as a result of the fracture, allowing air from the nasal cavity to enter the tissues of the eyelid. Alternatively, facial subcutaneous air may simply pass into the eyelids along fascial plane to produce palpebral emphysema. As long as the orbital septum is intact, air is confined in the eyelids.

=== True orbital emphysema ===
True orbital emphysema occurs when there is air behind an intact orbital septum. This condition arises due to a fracture of more than one bony orbital walls of paranasal sinuses and tearing of adjacent sinus mucosa, and communication of a sinus with the orbit is established. This fracture usually involves the ethmoid, and sometimes involves frontal, sphenoid, and maxillary sinuses. The air usually enters the orbit when the pressure within the upper respiratory tract is increased due to expiratory efforts, nose blowing or sneezing.

=== Orbitopalperbal emphysema ===
Orbitopalpebral emphysema refers to the trapping of air inside both the soft tissues of the orbit and the eyelid. It is usually a sequelae of a true orbital emphysema. When too much air accumulates inside the orbit, the orbital septum ruptures due to high intraorbital pressure. Air may then pass freely from the orbit into the eyelids through the break in the orbital septum.

== Stages ==
There are four stages of orbital emphysema.

=== Stage I ===
Stage I orbital emphysema can only be diagnosed with radiological films. There is only a small amount of intraorbital air, and the patient does not show any clinical signs or symptoms.

=== Stage II ===
Stage II orbital emphysema develops as the intraorbital air volume increases, causing the eyeball to displace horizontally or vertically (globe dystopia) or to protrude anteriorly (proptosis). The patient may experience diplopia as a result of the globe displacement.

=== Stage III ===
Stage III orbital emphysema develops when the limits of spontaneous decompression are exceeded. The pressure will be transmitted to orbital tissues and then to the globe, resulting in an increase in intraocular pressure which may cause visual loss when the nutrient vessels supplying the optic nerve are compressed.

=== Stage IV ===
Stage IV orbital emphysema develops when the intraorbital air mass results in an intraocular pressure of more than 60 to 70 mmHg. The significantly elevated intraocular pressure will lead to central retinal artery occlusion, which may result in permanent and irreversible damage to the retina.

== Clinical Diagnosis ==
The diagnosis of orbital emphysema is usually made by physical examination of the eyelids, and, or by computer tomography (CT).

=== Physical examination ===
Physical examination of the eyelid can be done by the palpation for the pathognomonic cracking, crepitation, and tense tissue on the upper and lower eyelids. The findings of the examination are supported with the medical history of the patient and confirmed with orbital CT.

=== Computed tomography (CT) ===
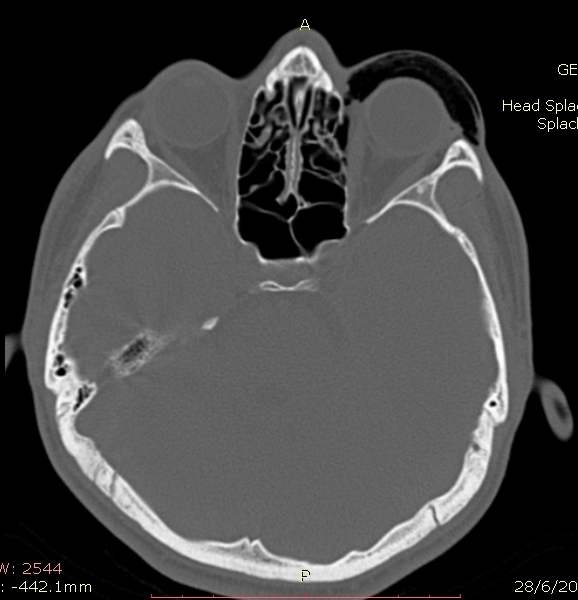
CT scan taken from the transverse plane demonstrating orbital emphysema.

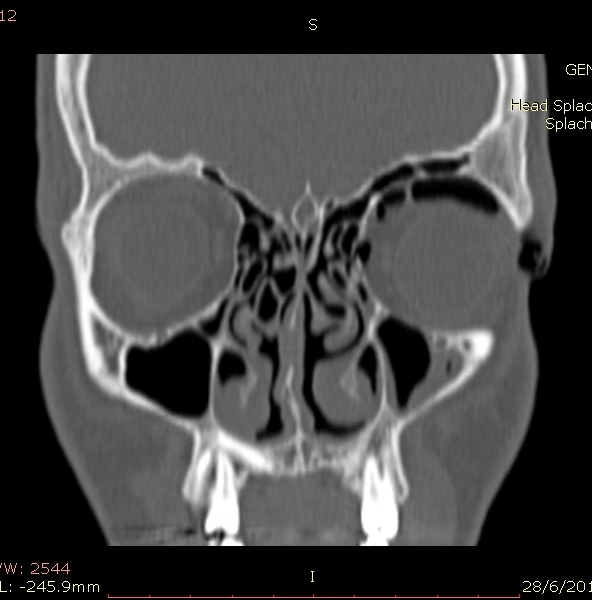
CT scan taken from the coronal plane demonstrating orbital emphysema.

Computed tomography is effective and sensitive in the diagnosis of orbital emphysema, as it can confirm the anatomical location and size of air, bony defects, indentation of the eyeball, and the condition of the optic nerve, as well as the presence of any extraocular muscle entrapment and herniation of preorbital fat into the sinus cavities. The location of the orbital emphysema is present near the site of the fracture. The scans are usually taken along the transverse plane. Transverse images allow the evaluation of fractures in medial and lateral orbital walls. By reformatting these transverse images or taking coronal images, the examination of orbital floor and roof is permitted. Helical scanning is preferred as it has a lower imaging time and radiation dose comparing to conventional scanning, especially when reforming transverse helical scans into coronal images. The staging of orbital emphysema can then be determined with visual acuity examination and ophthalmoscopy. A disadvantage of using a CT scan is that when detecting air after orbital trauma, the presence of a wooden foreign object can give a false positive result of orbital emphysema. The wooden object can mimic the presence of orbital emphysema. Therefore, patients' medical history is crucial in making the correct diagnosis.

=== Other tests ===
Conventional radiography is commonly employed for imaging orbital injuries and identifying orbital fractures. It can be used to diagnose orbital emphysema because it shows the presence of air in the orbit best while the patient is standing upright. Skull films of posterior-anterior, lateral projections, and orbital rim views are recommended to show fractures in orbital rims and walls. However, CT scan is better than conventional radiography in the diagnosis of the condition, as it has a lower high false-negative rate and non-diagnostic rate.

Orbital emphysema can also be diagnosed by magnetic resonance imaging (MRI). Although MRI has a low sensitivity for detecting orbital fractures, it can be used to evaluate rectus muscle pathology, optic nerve pathology, and brain pathology, as well as vascular injury.

== Treatment ==
Orbital emphysema on its own is a mild and self-limiting disease. The majority of cases of orbital emphysema are self-resolving and do not need treatment. The underlying causes and injuries that caused orbital emphysema, on the other hand, may be serious, necessitating urgent intervention including surgery. If related visual symptoms or other acute orbital compression symptoms are present, lateral canthotomy or cantholysis, orbital decompression by needle aspiration, and bone decompression may be required to relieve orbital pressure and preserve vision. Prophylactic oral antibiotics may be needed to prevent secondary infection.
