= Blepharoplasty =

Surgical modification of the eyelids

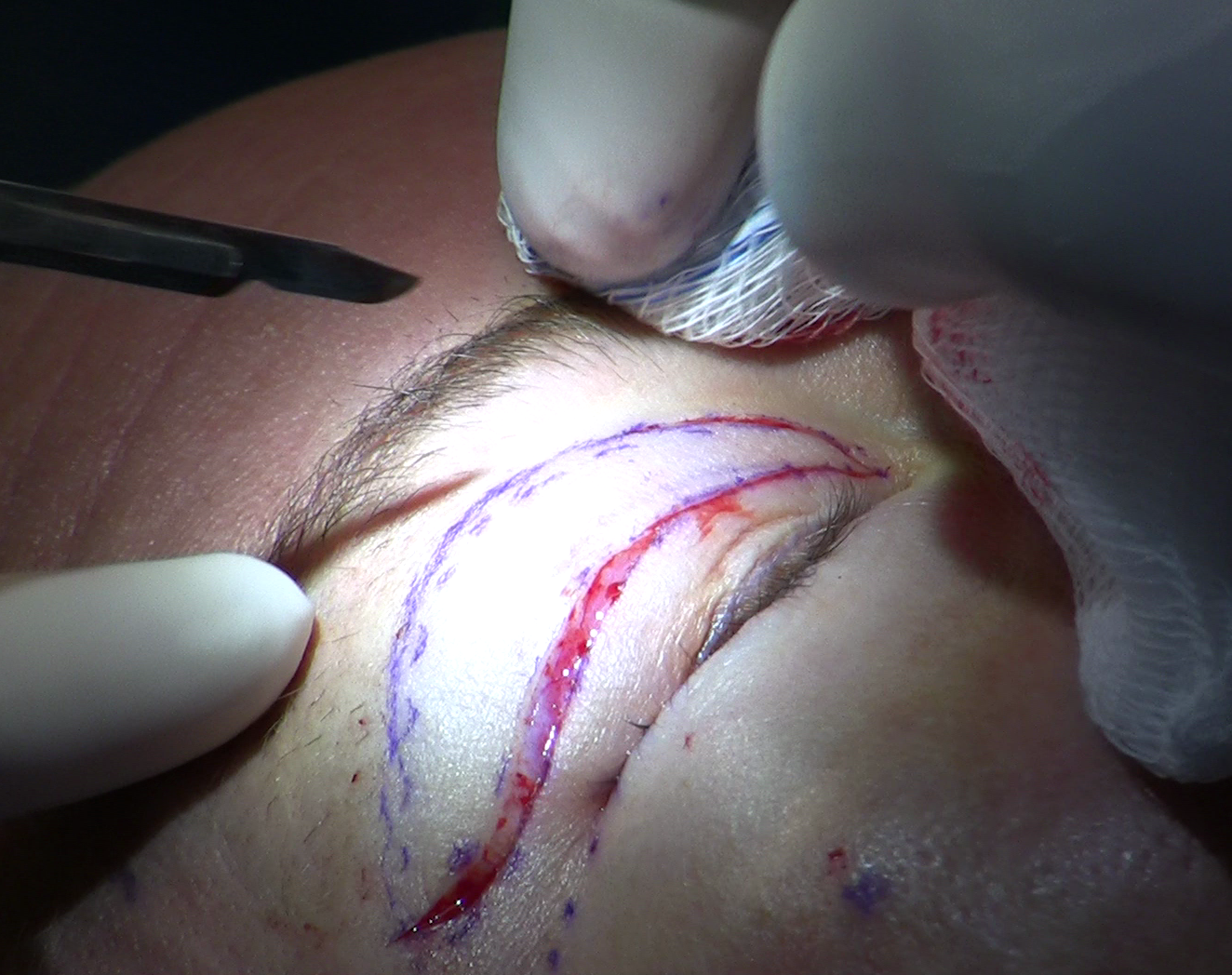
- Upper eyelid blepharoplasty: The blue-ink delineated surgical plan, and the incisions made to correct a defect of the patient's upper eyelid.
- ICD-9-CM: 08
- MeSH: D019882

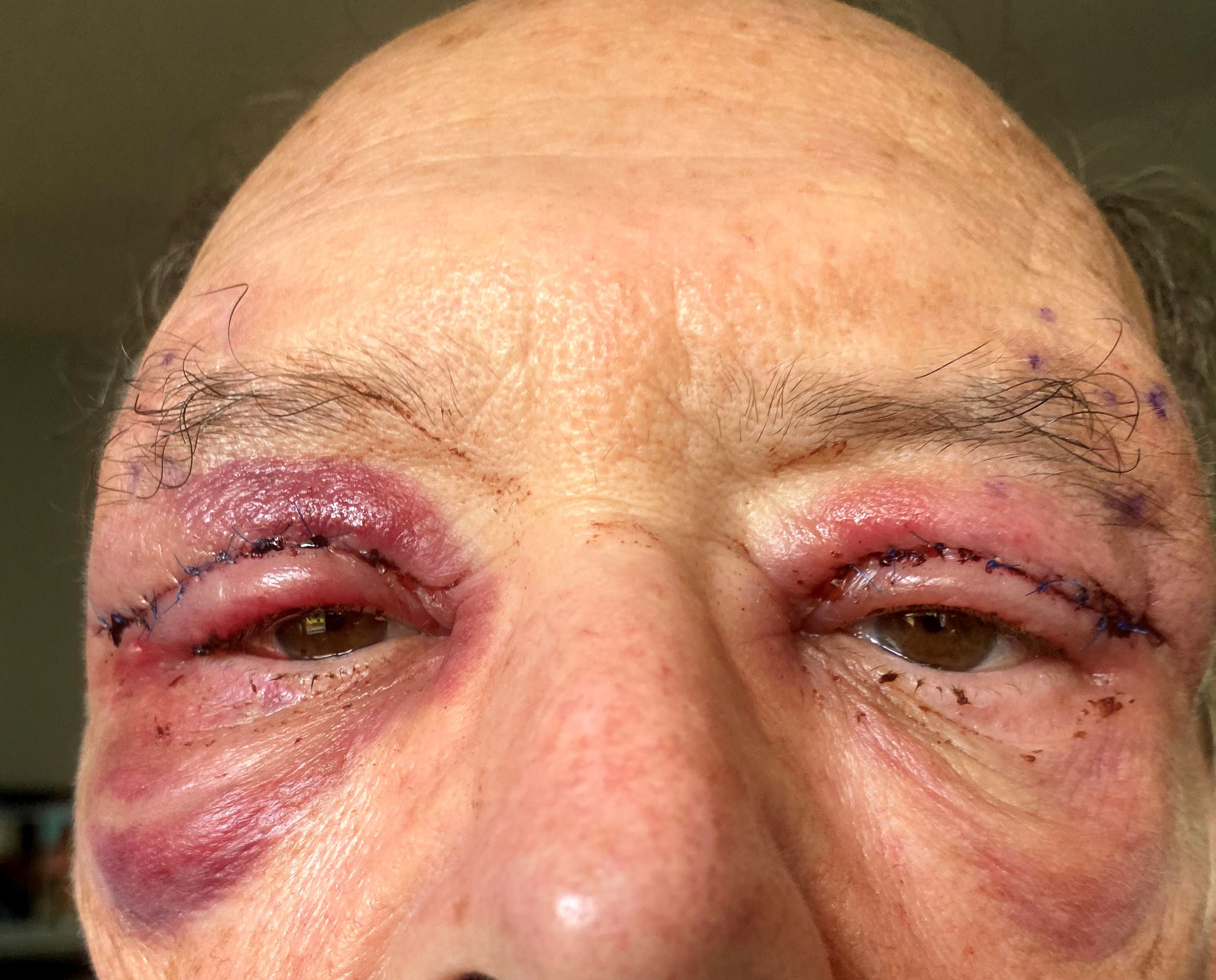
Appearance of a blepharoplasty on an adult male one day after surgery

Blepharoplasty, from Ancient Greek βλέφαρον (blépharon), meaning "eyelid", and πλαστός (plastós), meaning "molded", is the plastic surgery operation for correcting defects, deformities, and disfigurations of the eyelids; and for aesthetically modifying the eye region of the face. With the excision and the removal, or the repositioning (or both) of excess tissues, such as skin and adipocyte fat, and the reinforcement of the corresponding muscle and tendon tissues, the blepharoplasty procedure resolves functional and cosmetic problems of the periorbita, which is the area from the eyebrow to the upper portion of the cheek. The procedure is more common among women, who accounted for approximately 85% of blepharoplasty procedures in 2014 in the US and 88% of such procedures in the UK.

The operative goals of a blepharoplastic procedure are the restoration of the correct functioning to the affected eyelid(s) and the restoration of the aesthetics of the eye-region of the face, which are achieved by eliminating excess skin from the eyelid(s), smoothing the underlying eye muscles, tightening the supporting structures, and resecting and re-draping the excess fat of the retroseptal area of the eye, in order to produce a smooth anatomic transition from the lower eyelid to the cheek. In an eye surgery procedure, the usual correction or modification (or both) is of the upper and the lower eyelids, and of the surrounding tissues of the eyebrows, the upper nasal-bridge area, and the upper portions of the cheeks, which are achieved by modifying the periosteal coverings of the facial bones that form the orbit (eye socket). The periosteum comprises two-layer connective tissues that cover the bones of the human body:

- the external layer of networks of dense, connective tissues with blood vessels
- the internal, deep layer of collagenous bundles composed of spindle-shaped cells of connective tissue, and a network of thin, elastic fibres

The East Asian blepharoplasty procedure differs from the classic blepharoplasty. In younger patients, the goal of the surgery is to create a supratarsal fold ("double eyelid surgery"), whereas in older patients the goals are to create or elevate the supratarsal fold and to resect surplus eyelid skin ("Asian blepharoplasty").

== Medical uses ==
Incision lines for blepharoplasty

The thorough pre-operative medical and surgical histories, and the physical examination of the patient's periorbital area (eyebrow-to-cheek-to-nose), determine if the patient can safely undergo a blepharoplasty procedure to feasibly resolve (correct or modify, or both) the functional and aesthetic indications presented by the patient. Sequentially, lower eyelid blepharoplasty can successfully address the anatomic matters of excess eyelid skin, slackness of the eye-muscles and of the orbital septum (palpebral ligament), excess orbital fat, malposition of the lower eyelid, and prominence of the nasojugal groove, where the orbit (eye socket) meets the slope of the nose.

Concerning the upper eyelid, a blepharoplasty procedure can resolve the loss of peripheral vision, caused by the slackness of the upper-eyelid skin draping over the eyelashes; the outer and the upper portions of the field of vision of the patient are affected and cause him or her difficulty in performing mundane activities such as driving an automobile and reading a book.

== Cosmetic uses ==
In many East Asian countries, double-eyelid surgery is the most popular surgery, especially in South Korea. Depending on the methods, directing doctors' experience and the difficulty of the individual case, this surgery can cost between about US$2,000 to $4,000. The procedure is famous for producing double-eyelid for patients for the long term. This kind of operation normally takes about thirty minutes to an hour, and patients are not required to stay hospitalized afterward. Stitches are removed five to seven days after surgery. Many foreigners go to South Korea each year for blepharoplasty.

== Procedures ==
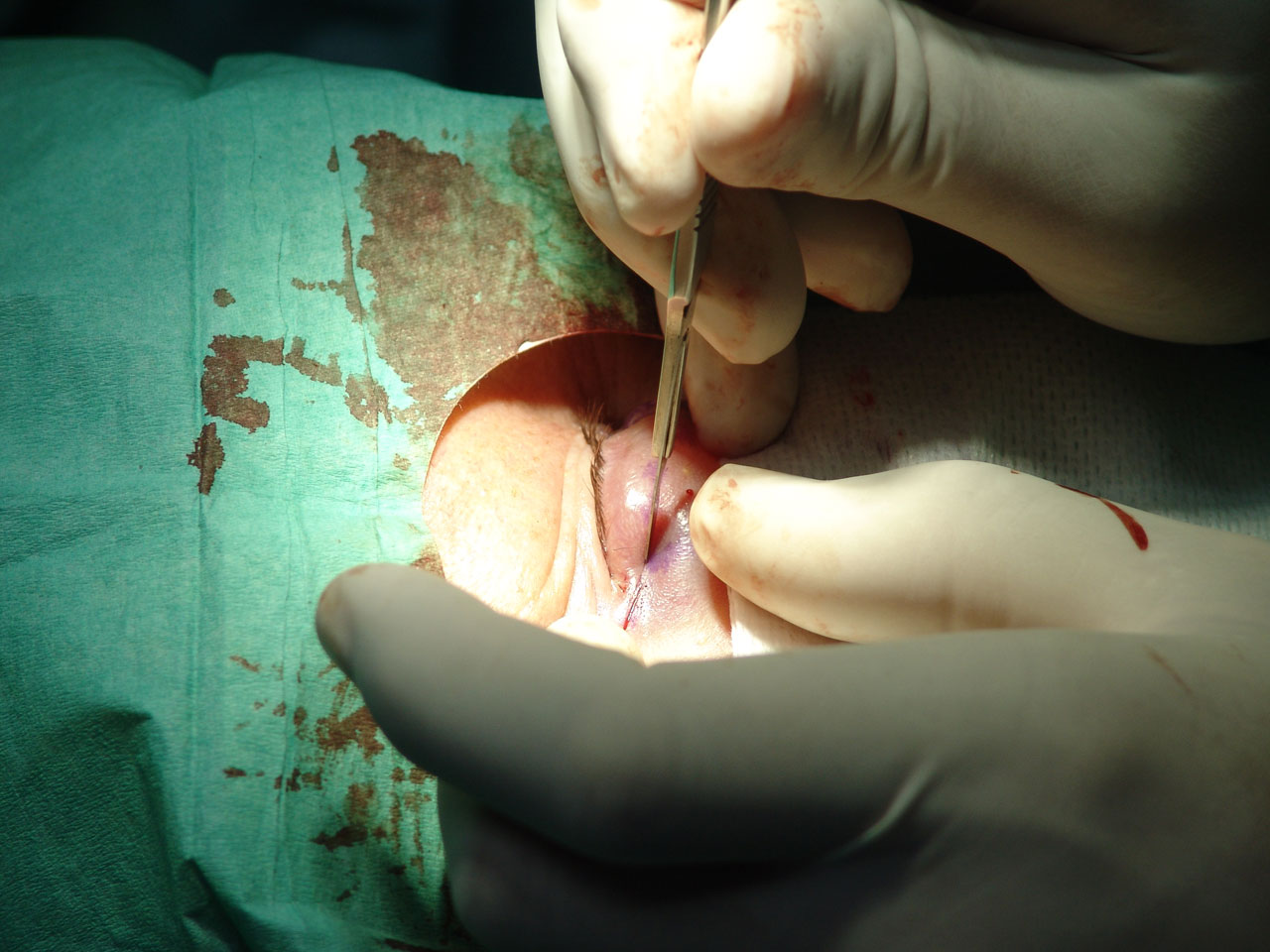
Initial incision along the upper left eyelid

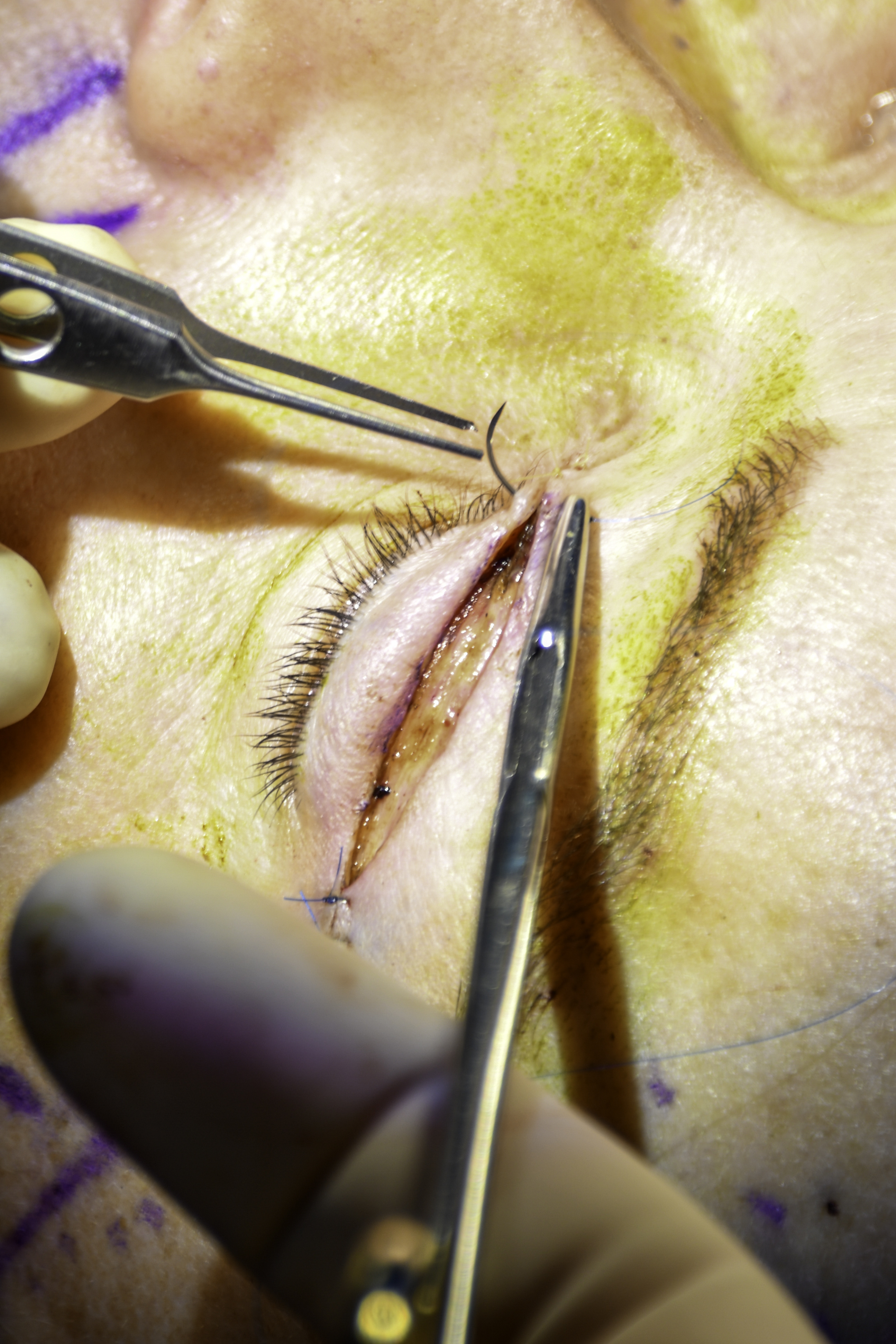
Upper eyelid incision closure during blepharoplasty with fine sutures

Blepharoplasty may be performed using different surgical approaches depending on the location and extent of correction required.

=== Upper blepharoplasty ===
Upper blepharoplasty typically involves an incision placed within the natural crease of the upper eyelid. Through this incision, excess skin, muscle, and, when appropriate, orbital fat may be removed or repositioned. The incision is designed to heal within the natural eyelid fold, minimizing visible scarring.

This procedure may be performed for cosmetic improvement or to restore visual function in patients with significant upper eyelid skin redundancy.

=== Lower blepharoplasty ===
Lower blepharoplasty addresses changes in the lower eyelid, including fat protrusion, skin laxity, and alterations of the eyelid–cheek contour. Two primary approaches are used.

==== Transcutaneous lower blepharoplasty ====
In transcutaneous lower blepharoplasty, an incision is made just below the eyelashes. This approach allows for removal or repositioning of orbital fat, excision of excess skin, and modification of the orbicularis oculi muscle when necessary. It is typically used in patients with significant skin laxity.

==== Transconjunctival lower blepharoplasty ====
Transconjunctival blepharoplasty is performed through an incision on the inner surface of the lower eyelid. This technique allows for removal or repositioning of orbital fat without an external scar and is commonly used in patients with minimal or no excess skin. Because skin is not removed, additional procedures may be required if skin laxity is present.

Transconjunctival blepharoplasty of the right lower eyelid

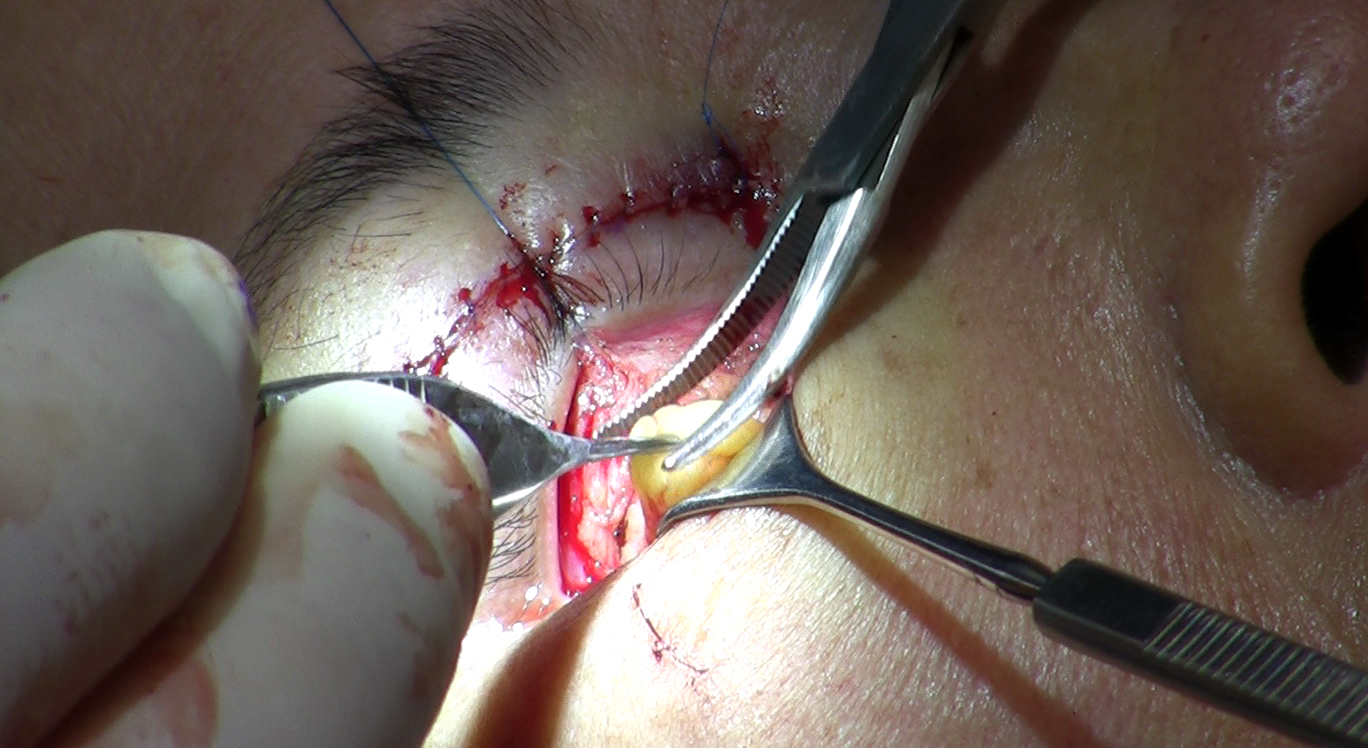
Fat is removed from the lower eyelid by means of an incision to the inner surface of the eyelid. A surgical suture retains the inner tissue of the eyelid over the eyeball.

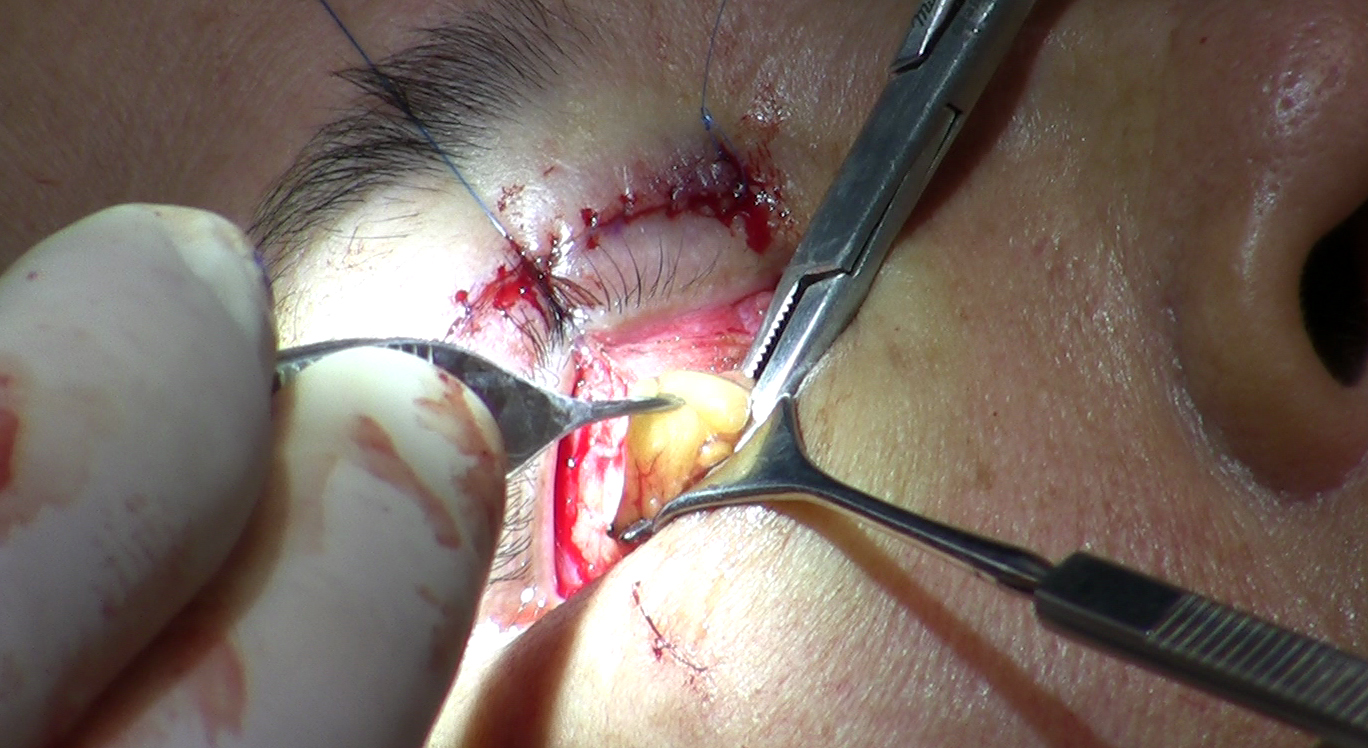
The fat is held with forceps (left), and clamped with a hemostat (right), while a small medical retractor keeps away the extra tissue, so that the surgeon can operate (bottom right).

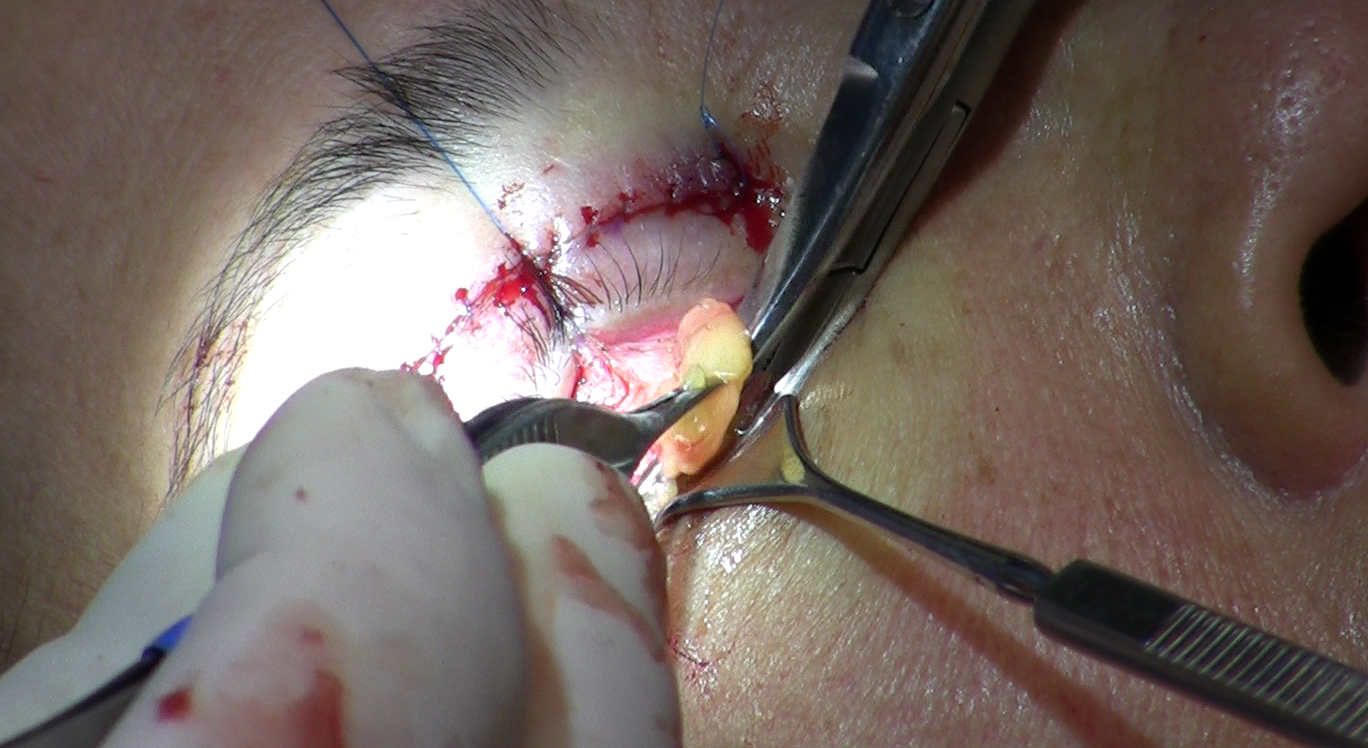
The fat is excised (cut away) with surgical scissors.

=== Adjunctive techniques ===
Additional procedures may be performed in conjunction with blepharoplasty to support eyelid position and optimize outcomes. These may include canthopexy or canthoplasty to stabilize the lateral eyelid, as well as midface elevation or fat repositioning to improve the transition between the lower eyelid and cheek.

==== Canthopexy and canthoplasty ====
Canthopexy and canthoplasty are procedures used to support and stabilize the lateral canthus. These techniques help maintain proper eyelid position, particularly in lower blepharoplasty, and may reduce the risk of postoperative eyelid malposition.

==== Fat repositioning ====
Fat repositioning involves mobilizing orbital fat and redistributing it along the infraorbital rim to improve contour irregularities. This technique is commonly used to smooth the transition between the lower eyelid and cheek and to address tear trough deformities.

==== Fat transfer ====
Fat transfer may be performed to restore volume in the periorbital region. Autologous fat is harvested from another area of the body and injected into areas of volume deficiency to improve contour and support surrounding tissues.

=== Recovery and outcomes ===
Blepharoplasty is typically performed as an outpatient procedure and may take one to three hours depending on the extent of surgery. Postoperative swelling and bruising are common and generally resolve over several weeks. Supportive measures such as cold compresses and head elevation are often recommended during the early recovery period.

Incisions are typically closed with fine sutures, which may be removed within several days in the case of external approaches or may be absorbable depending on the technique used. Suture management and wound care play a role in minimizing scarring and supporting proper healing.

Results vary based on patient anatomy and surgical technique, but generally include improvement in eyelid contour, reduction of excess tissue, and a more defined eyelid–cheek junction.

== Anatomy of the eyelids ==
Blepharoplasty involves modification of the anatomical structures of the upper and lower eyelids to improve both function and appearance. A detailed understanding of eyelid anatomy is essential for preserving eyelid support, maintaining normal closure and achieving natural, balanced results.

=== Eyelid layers ===
The eyelid consists of multiple layers, including the skin, subcutaneous tissue, orbicularis oculi muscle, orbital septum, orbital fat, tarsal plate, and conjunctiva. The skin is thin and prone to redundancy with age, while the orbital septum helps contain the orbital fat, which may protrude and contribute to eyelid "bags."

=== Upper eyelid ===
The upper eyelid contains medial and central fat compartments and is elevated by the levator palpebrae superioris muscle. The eyelid crease is formed by attachments of the levator aponeurosis to the skin. Aging changes include excess skin and fat prominence.

=== Lower eyelid ===
The lower eyelid contains medial, central, and lateral fat compartments and transitions into the cheek at the tear trough. Supporting structures, including the canthal tendons, help maintain eyelid position. Fat protrusion and contour changes contribute to the appearance of under-eye “bags.”

=== Age-related changes ===
Aging affects multiple layers of the eyelid, leading to skin laxity, weakening of the orbital septum, fat herniation, and volume loss. These changes contribute to upper eyelid hooding and lower eyelid contour irregularities.

== History ==
As techniques began developing the ancient Greeks and Romans began writing down and collecting everything they knew involving these procedures. Aulus Cornelius Celsus, a first-century Roman, described making an excision in the skin to relax the eyelids in his book De Medicina.

Karl Ferdinand von Gräfe coined the phrase blepharoplasty in 1818 when the technique was used for repairing deformities caused by cancer in the eyelids.

== Laser ==
Laser blepharoplasty is the performance of eyelid surgery using a laser instead of a scalpel. Laser blepharoplasty is often combined with laser eyelid rejuvenation, as the two procedures can be performed in conjunction.

A CO_{2} laser blepharoplasty offers many benefits over a blepharoplasty performed using a scalpel. Some of these benefits include less bleeding, shortened surgical time, better intraoperative visibility, less bruising and swelling, less pain or discomfort, and smoother healing. Historically there has been some contention as to the categorization of laser treatment on upper or lower eyelids as blepharoplasty, which is itself by definition surgical. The statutory definition of surgery and that supported by the American College of Surgeons states that surgery is the "treatment ... by any instrument causing localized alteration or transportation of live human tissue, which include lasers".

== See also ==
- Eye surgery
- Dermatochalasis
- Maxillofacial surgery
- Oculoplastics
- Plastic surgery
