= Periorbita =

Periosteum lining the walls of the bony orbit

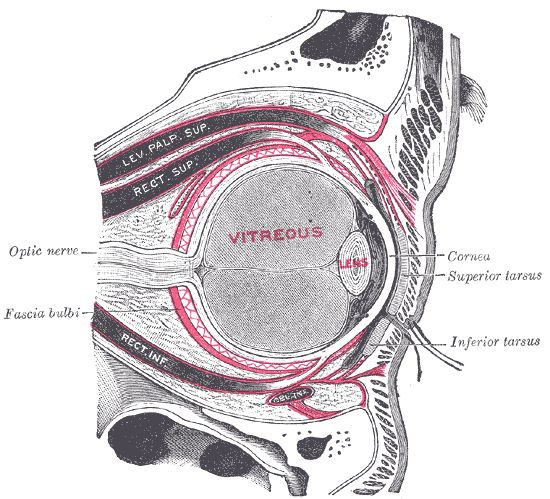
- Eye

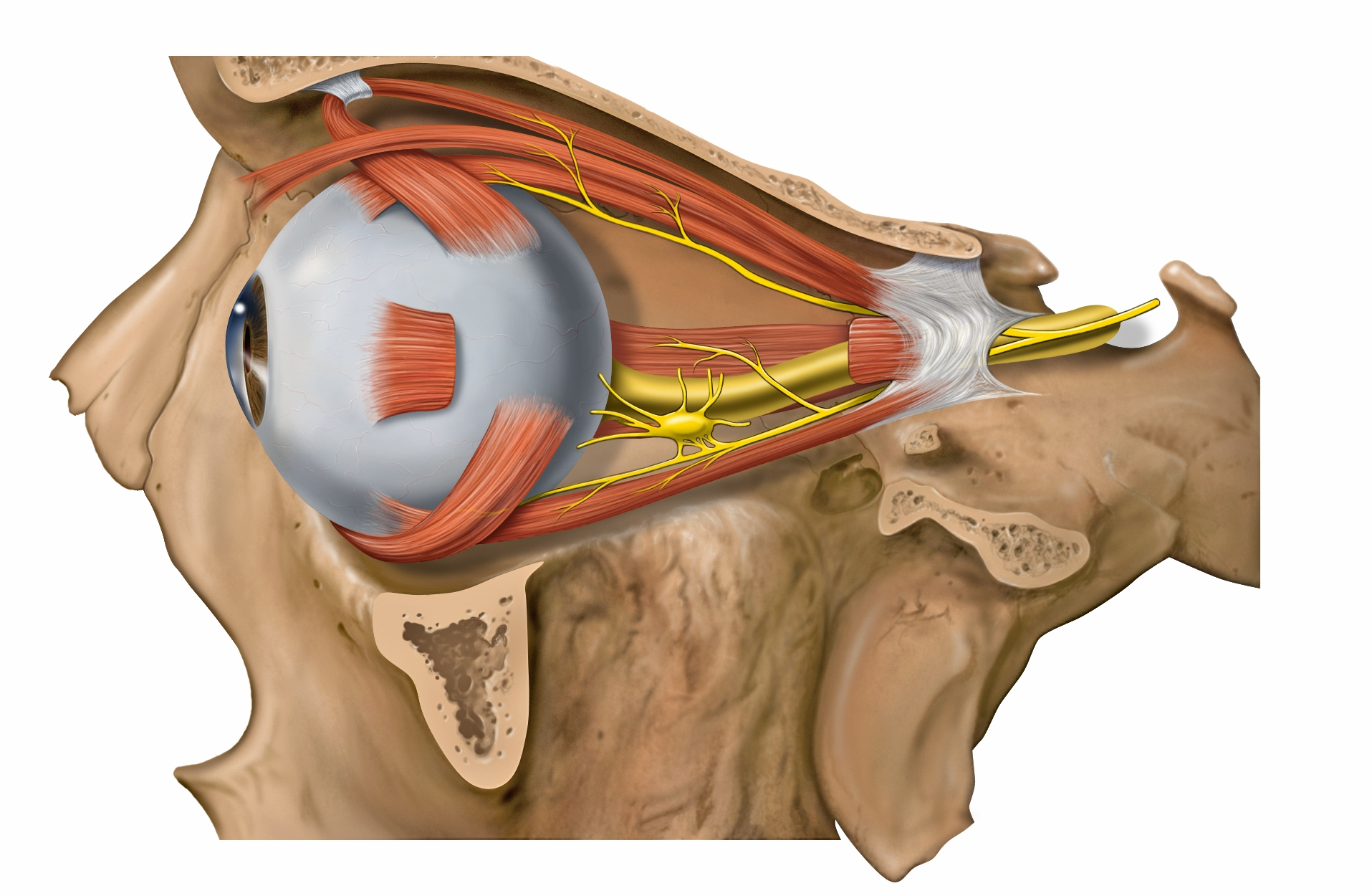
- Orbit

Details

Identifiers
- Latin: periorbita
- TA98: A15.2.07.002
- TA2: 470
- FMA: 59351

The periorbita is the area around the orbit. Sometimes it refers specifically to the layer of tissue surrounding the orbit that consists of periosteum. However, it may refer to anything that is around the orbit, such as in periorbital cellulitis.
