= Periorbital cellulitis =

Inflammation of the eyelid and eye

- Other names: Preseptal cellulitis
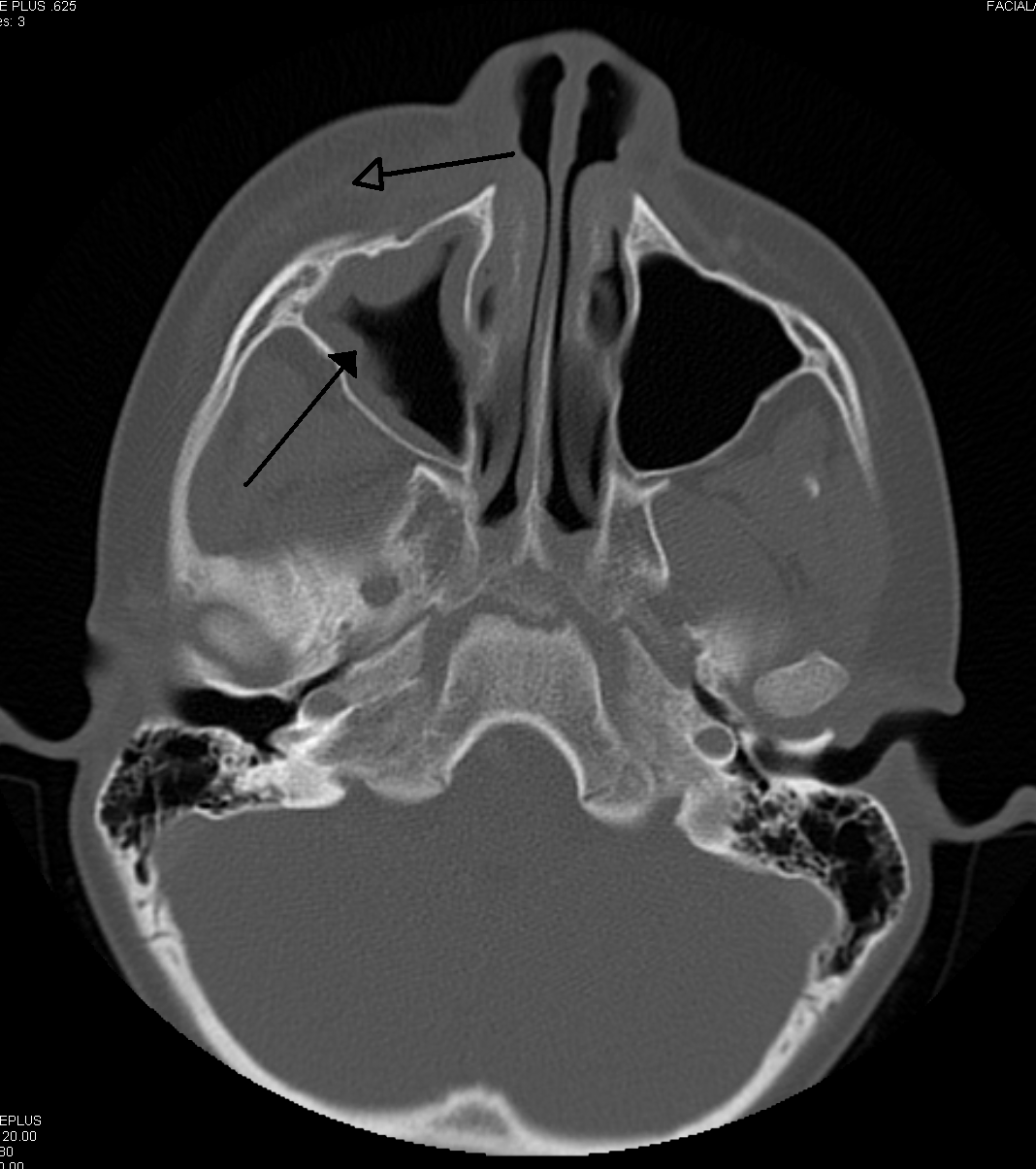
- Periorbital cellulitis of the right eye caused by a dental infection (also causing maxillary sinusitis)
- Specialty: Ophthalmology

Periorbital cellulitis, or preseptal cellulitis, is an inflammation and infection of the eyelid and portions of skin around the eye anterior to the orbital septum. It may be caused by breaks in the skin around the eye, and subsequent spread to the eyelid; infection of the sinuses around the nose (sinusitis); or from spread of an infection elsewhere through the blood.

== Signs and symptoms ==
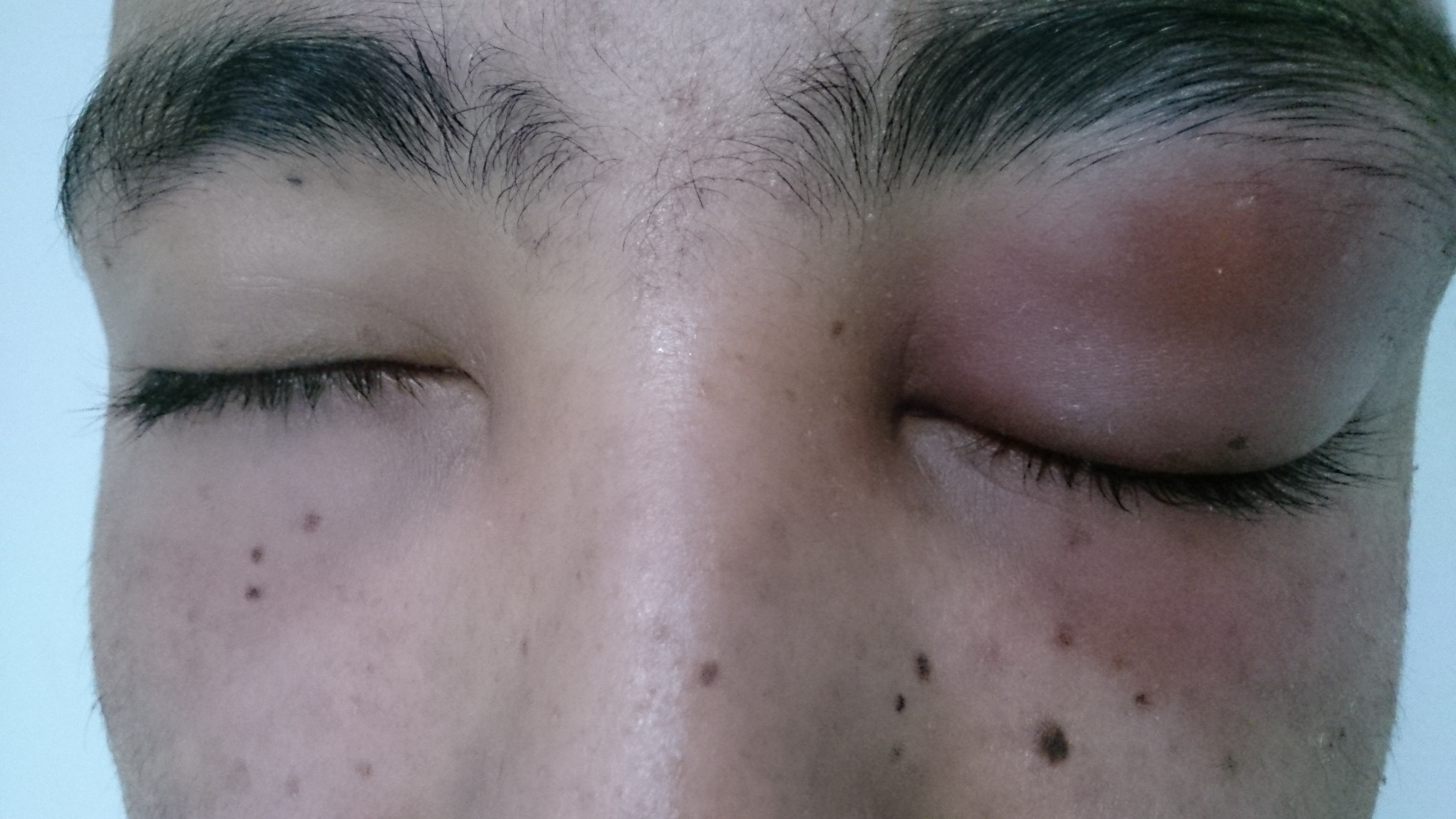
Periorbital cellulitis of the left eye

Periorbital cellulitis must be differentiated from orbital cellulitis, which is an emergency and requires intravenous (IV) antibiotics. In contrast to orbital cellulitis, patients with periorbital cellulitis do not have bulging of the eye (proptosis), limited eye movement (ophthalmoplegia), pain on eye movement, or loss of vision. If any of these features is present, one must assume that the patient has orbital cellulitis and begin treatment with IV antibiotics. CT scan may be done to delineate the extension of the infection.

Affected individuals may experience: swelling, redness, discharge, pain, shut eye, conjunctival infection, fever (mild), slightly blurred vision, teary eyes, and some reduction in vision.

Typical signs include periorbital erythema, induration, tenderness and warmth.

== Causes ==
Staphylococcus aureus, Streptococcus pneumoniae, other streptococci, and anaerobes are the most common causes, depending on the origin of the infection.

The advent of the Haemophilus influenzae vaccine has dramatically decreased the incidence.

== Diagnosis ==
Tests include blood work (CBC) to rule out infectious cause. Also perform a CT scan, x ray of the anterior skull to view the sinuses, MRI scan and finally a soft tissue ultrasound of the orbital region.

== Treatment ==
Antibiotics are aimed at gram positive bacteria. Medical attention should be sought if symptoms persist beyond 2–3 days.

There is inadequate evidence to draw conclusions about the adjunctive corticosteroid therapy in the treatment of periorbital cellulitis. More research is needed to inform decision making.

== See also ==
- Orbital cellulitis
- Cellulitis
