= Orbital septum =

Membranous sheet that acts as the anterior (frontal) boundary of the orbit

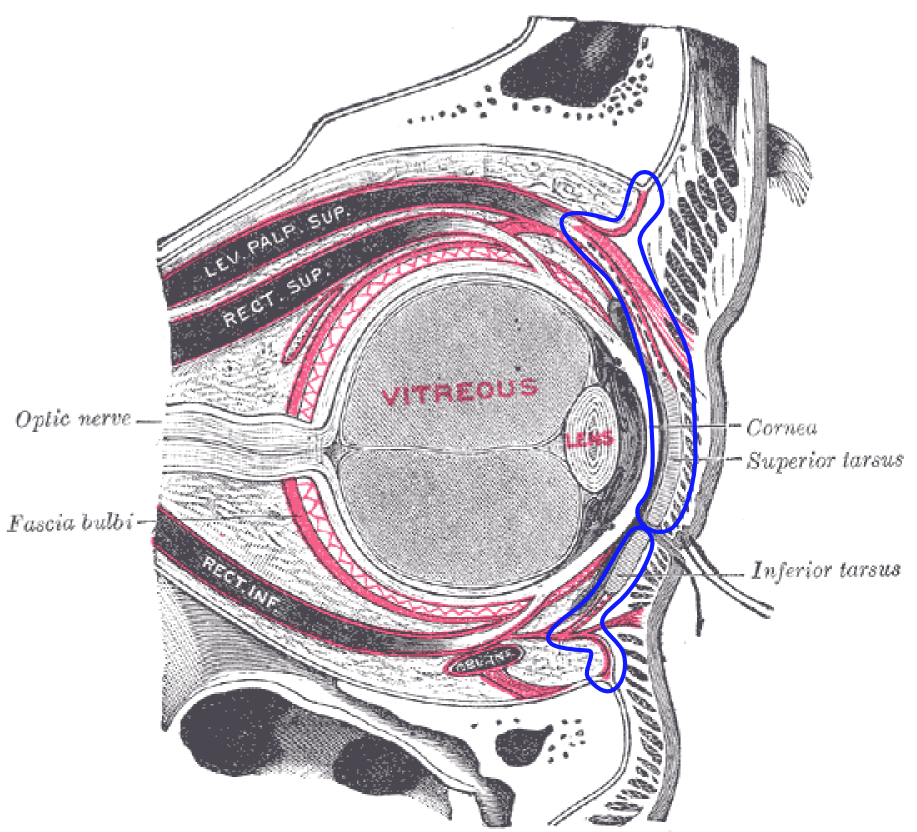
- The right eye in sagittal section, with structures of the orbital septum within blue markings.

Details

Identifiers
- Latin: septum orbitale
- TA98: A15.2.07.003
- TA2: 471
- FMA: 59328

In anatomy, the orbital septum (palpebral fascia) is a membranous sheet that acts as the anterior (frontal) boundary of the orbit. It extends from the orbital rims to the eyelids. It forms the fibrous portion of the eyelids.

== Structure ==
In the upper eyelid, the orbital septum blends with the tendon of the levator palpebrae superioris, and in the lower eyelid with the tarsal plate.

When the eyes are closed, the whole orbital opening is covered by the septum and tarsi. Medially it is thin, and, becoming separated from the medial palpebral ligament, attaches to the lacrimal bone at its posterior crest. The medial ligament and its much weaker lateral counterpart, attached to the septum and orbit, keep the lids stable as the eye moves.

The septum is perforated by the vessels and nerves which pass from the orbital cavity to the face and scalp.

== Clinical significance ==
Orbital septum supports the orbital contents located posterior to it, especially orbital fat. The septum can be weakened by trauma or due to hereditary diseases. Anatomical structures important in the blepharoplasty operation (operation to strengthen the orbital septum) are located posterior to the orbital septum.

The orbital septum is an important structure that separates anterior and posterior extent of the orbit. Orbital septum acts as a physical barrier that prevents the infection of the anterior part of the eye spreading posteriorly. For example, preseptal cellulitis mainly infects the eyelids, anterior to the orbital septum. Meanwhile, orbital cellulitis is located posterior the orbital septum, due to infections spreading from the ethmoidal sinuses. The porous lamina papyracea separating the orbit from the ethmoidal sinus causes infection to spread between the orbit and ethmoidal sinuses. Infection of the ethmoidal sinuses can spread to the brain, causing meningitis and cerebral abscess. Orbital cellulitis can also spread to the anterior orbit, by lifting the loosely attached periosteum, causing subperiosteal abscess.

== Imaging ==
Orbital septum appears as hypointense on both MRI T1 and T2 weighted images, in contrast with surrounding hyperintense fat.
