= Ophthalmology =

Field of medicine treating eye disorders

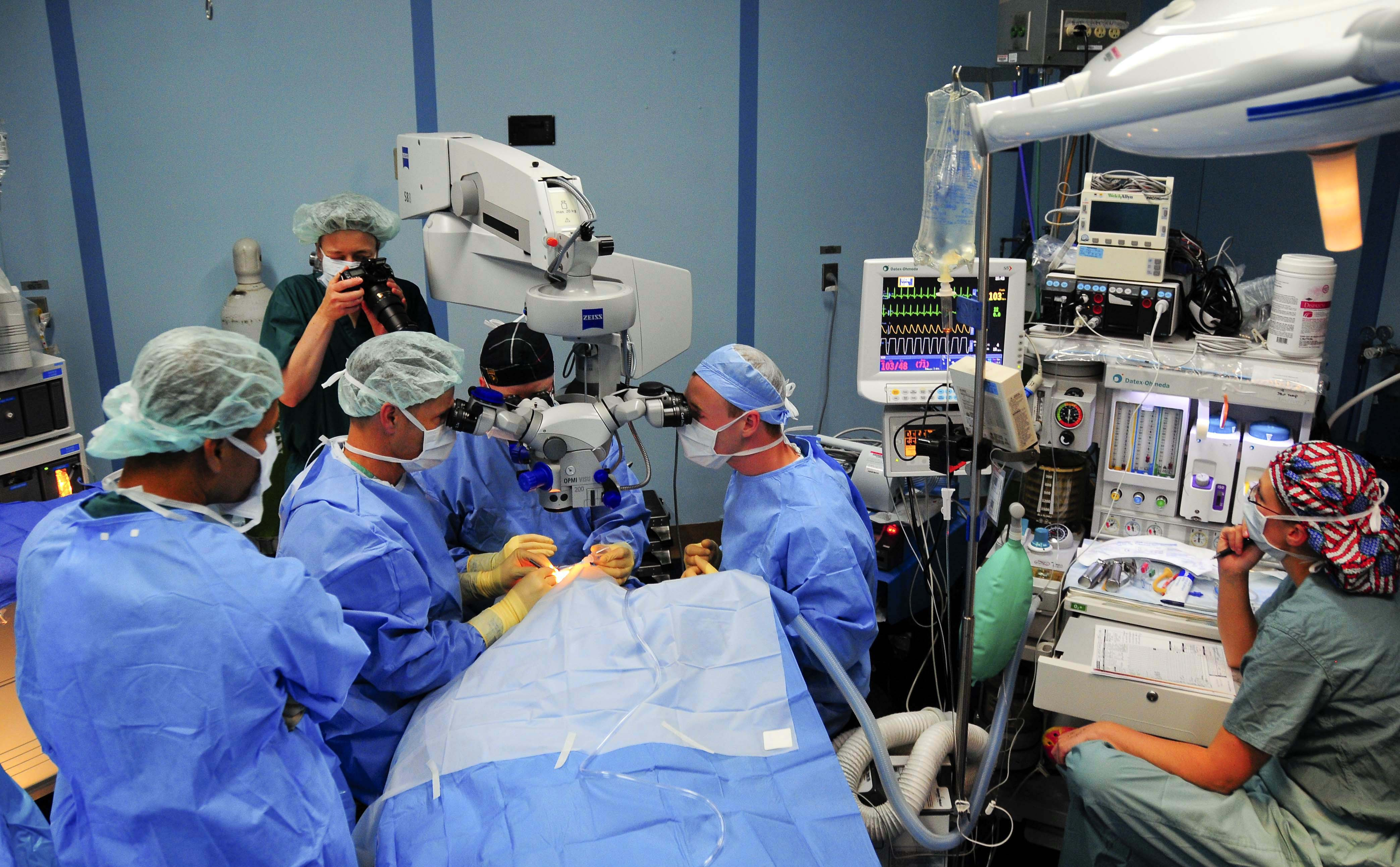
- Ophthalmologists performing cataract surgery using an operating microscope
- System: Eye and visual system
- Significant diseases: Cataract, retinal disease (including diabetic retinopathy and other types of retinopathy), glaucoma, corneal disease, eyelid and orbital disorders, uveitis, strabismus and disorders of the ocular muscles, ocular neoplasms (malignancies, or cancers, and benign eye tumors), neuro-ophthalmologic disorders (including disorders of the optic nerve)
- Significant tests: Ophthalmoscopy, visual field test, optical coherence tomography
- Specialist: Ophthalmologist
- Glossary: Glossary of medicine

Ophthalmologist
Occupation
- Names: Physician; Surgeon
- Occupation type: Specialty
- Activity sectors: Medicine, surgery

Description
- Education required: Doctor of Medicine (MD), Doctor of Osteopathic Medicine (DO), Bachelor of Medicine, Bachelor of Surgery (MBBS), Bachelor of Medicine, Bachelor of Surgery (MBChB)
- Fields of employment: Hospitals, Clinics

Ophthalmology (/ˌɒfθælˈmɒlədʒi/, OFF-thal-MOL-ə-jee) is the branch of medicine that deals with the diagnosis, treatment, and surgery of eye diseases and disorders. Ophthalmologists also diagnose systemic (other parts of the body) diseases using changes seen in the eyes.

An ophthalmologist is a physician with an MD or DO degree who undergoes specialty training in medical and surgical eye care. In the United States, following graduation from medical school, one must complete a four-year residency in ophthalmology to become an ophthalmologist. Following residency, additional sub-specialty training (or fellowship) may be sought in a particular aspect of eye diseases.

Ophthalmologists prescribe medications to treat eye diseases, implement laser therapy, and perform surgery when needed. Ophthalmologists provide both primary and specialty eye care—medical and surgical. Most ophthalmologists participate in academic research on eye diseases at some point in their training, and many include research as part of their career. Ophthalmology has always been at the forefront of medical research with a long history of advancement and innovation in eye care.

A former term for this medical branch is oculism.

== Diseases ==
A brief list of some of the most common diseases treated by ophthalmologists:

- Cataract
- Excessive tearing (tear duct obstruction and others)
- Proptosis (bulging eyes)
- Graves' ophthalmopathy
- Eye, lid and orbit tumors
- Ptosis (drooping eyelid)
- Diabetic retinopathy
- Dry eye syndrome
- Glaucoma
- Macular degeneration
- Retinal detachment
- Endophthalmitis (infection in the eye)
- Refractive errors (glasses, contact lenses, surgery including LASIK)
- Strabismus (misalignment or deviation of eyes)
- Uveitis (Eye inflammation)
- Eye injury
- Globe rupture
- Orbital fracture

== Diagnosis ==
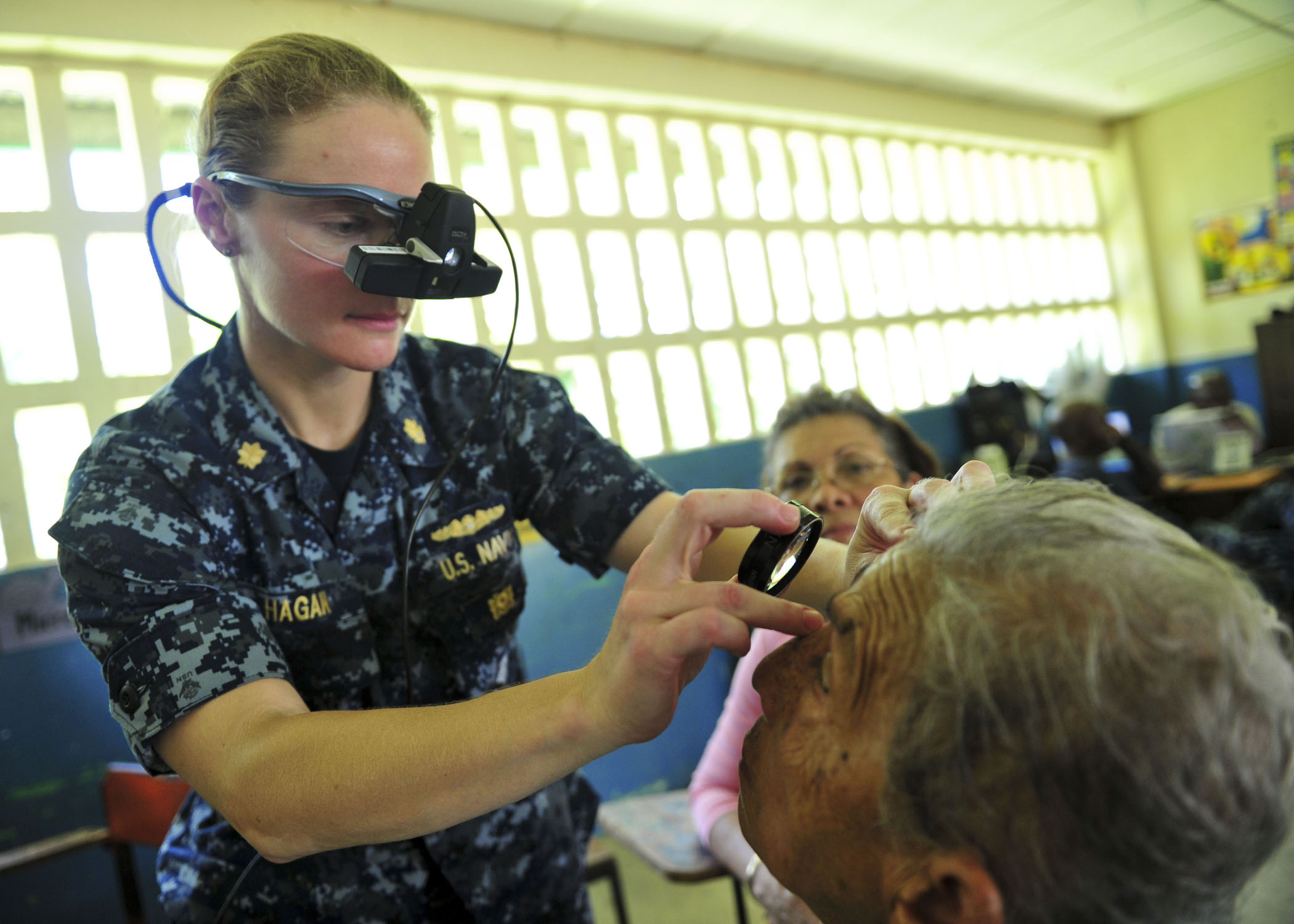
Indirect ophthalmoscopy

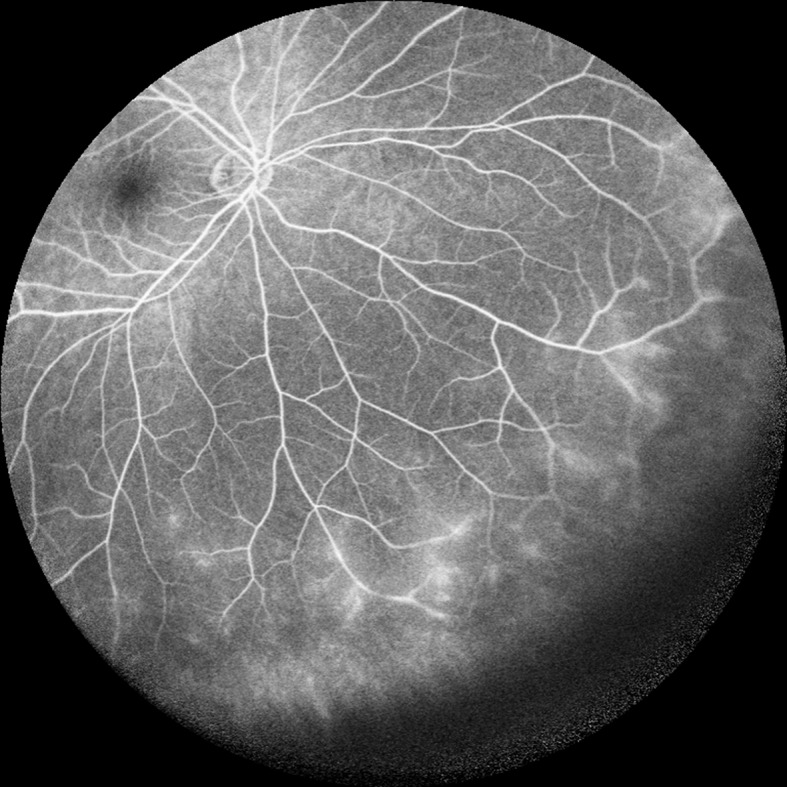
Fluorescein angiography

=== Eye examination ===
The following are steps often performed during a complete eye examination that enable diagnosis:

- Visual acuity assessment
- Ocular tonometry to determine intraocular pressure
- Extraocular motility and ocular alignment assessment
- Slit lamp examination
- Dilated fundus examination
- Gonioscopy
- Refraction

=== Specialized tests ===
Optical coherence tomography (OCT) is a medical technological platform used to assess ocular structures. Physicians then use the information to assess the staging of pathological processes and confirm clinical diagnoses. Subsequent OCT scans are used to assess the efficacy of managing diabetic retinopathy, age-related macular degeneration, and glaucoma.

Optical coherence tomography angiography (OCTA) and fluorescein angiography to visualize the vascular networks of the retina and choroid.

Electroretinography (ERG) measures the electrical responses of various cell types in the retina, including the photoreceptors (rods and cones), inner retinal cells (bipolar and amacrine cells), and the ganglion cells.

Electrooculography (EOG) is a technique for measuring the corneo-retinal standing potential that exists between the front and the back of the human eye. The resulting signal is called the electrooculogram. Primary applications are in ophthalmological diagnosis and in recording eye movements.

Visual field testing to detect dysfunction in central and peripheral vision which may be caused by various medical conditions such as glaucoma, stroke, pituitary disease, brain tumours or other neurological deficits.

Corneal topography is a non-invasive medical imaging technique for mapping the anterior curvature of the cornea, the outer structure of the eye.

Ultrasonography of the eyes may be performed by an ophthalmologist.

== Ophthalmic surgery ==
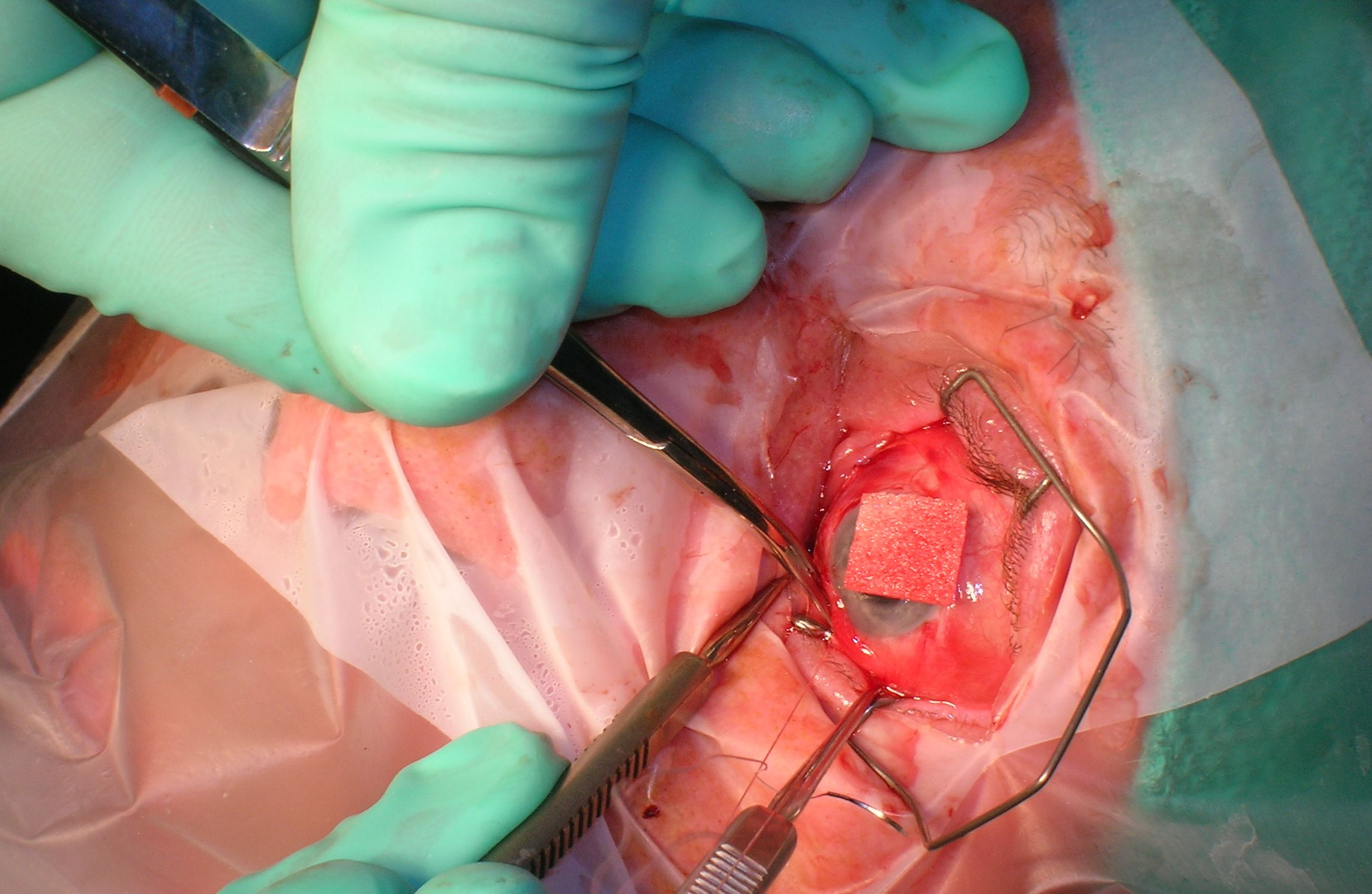
An ophthalmologist performing surgery

Eye surgery, also known as ocular surgery, is surgery performed on the eye or its adnexa by an ophthalmologist. The eye is a fragile organ and requires extreme care before, during, and after a surgical procedure. An eye surgeon is responsible for selecting the appropriate surgical procedure for the patient and for taking the necessary safety precautions.

== Subspecialties ==
Ophthalmology includes subspecialities that deal either with certain diseases or diseases of certain parts of the eye. Some of them are:

- Anterior segment surgery
- Cornea, ocular surface, and external disease
- Glaucoma
- Neuro-ophthalmology
- Ocular oncology
- Oculoplastics and orbit surgery
- Ophthalmic pathology
- Pediatric ophthalmology/strabismus (misalignment of the eyes)
- Refractive surgery
- Medical retina, deals with treatment of retinal problems through non-surgical means
- Uveitis
- Veterinary specialty training programs in veterinary ophthalmology exist in some countries.
- Vitreo-retinal surgery, deals with surgical management of retinal and posterior segment diseases

Medical retina and vitreo-retinal surgery are sometimes combined, and together they are called posterior segment subspecialization.

== Etymology ==
The Greek roots of the word ophthalmology are ὀφθαλμός (ophthalmos, "eye") and -λoγία (-logia, "study, discourse"), i.e., "the study of eyes". The discipline applies to all animal eyes, whether human or not, since the practice and procedures are quite similar with respect to disease processes, although there are differences in the anatomy or disease prevalence.

== History ==
=== Ancient near east and the Greek period ===
In the Ebers Papyrus from ancient Egypt dating to 1550 BC, a section is devoted to eye diseases.

Prior to Hippocrates, physicians largely based their anatomical conceptions of the eye on speculation, rather than empiricism. They recognized the sclera and transparent cornea running flushly as the outer coating of the eye, with an inner layer with pupil, and a fluid at the centre. It was believed, by Alcamaeon (fifth century BC) and others, that this fluid was the medium of vision and flowed from the eye to the brain by a tube. Aristotle advanced such ideas with empiricism. He dissected the eyes of animals, and discovering three layers (not two), found that the fluid was of a constant consistency with the lens forming (or congealing) after death, and the surrounding layers were seen to be juxtaposed. He and his contemporaries further put forth the existence of three tubes leading from the eye, not one. One tube from each eye met within the skull.

The Greek physician Rufus of Ephesus (first century AD) recognized a more modern concept of the eye, with conjunctiva, extending as a fourth epithelial layer over the eye. Rufus was the first to recognise a two-chambered eye, with one chamber from cornea to lens (filled with water), the other from lens to retina (filled with a substance resembling egg whites).

Celsus the Greek philosopher of the second century AD gave a detailed description of cataract surgery by the couching method.

The Greek physician Galen (second century AD) remedied some mistaken descriptions, including about the curvature of the cornea and lens, the nature of the optic nerve, and the existence of a posterior chamber. Although this model was a roughly correct modern model of the eye, it contained errors. Still, it was not advanced upon again until after Vesalius. A ciliary body was then discovered and the sclera, retina, choroid, and cornea were seen to meet at the same point. The two chambers were seen to hold the same fluid, as well as the lens being attached to the choroid. Galen continued the notion of a central canal, but he dissected the optic nerve and saw that it was solid. He mistakenly counted seven optical muscles, one too many. He also knew of the tear ducts.

=== Ancient India ===
The Sushruta Samhita is an ancient Sanskrit text attributed to the Indian surgeon Sushruta. The final volume of the Sushruta Samhita, known as the Uttaratantra, contains the ophthalmic sections of the work, including the method of cataract surgery, and is attributed in the traditions of both India and China to a figure named Nagarjuna, who lived in the early Common Era.

The Uttaratantra describes 76 ocular diseases (of these, 51 surgical) as well as several ophthalmological surgical instruments and techniques. His description of cataract surgery was compatible with the method of couching.

=== Medieval Islam ===
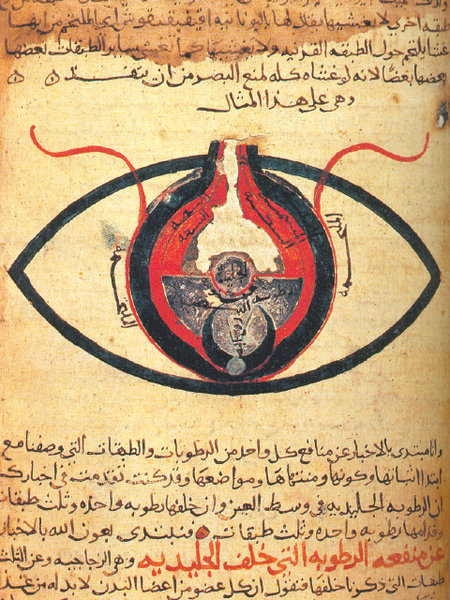
Anatomy of the Eye, 1200 A.D.

Medieval Islamic Arabic and Persian scientists (unlike their classical predecessors) considered it normal to combine theory and practice, including the crafting of precise instruments, and therefore found it natural to combine the study of the eye with the practical application of that knowledge. Hunayn ibn Ishaq (a Christian), and others beginning with the medieval Arabic period, taught that the crystalline lens is in the exact center of the eye. This idea was propagated until the end of the 1500s.

Ibn al-Nafis, an Arabic native of Damascus, wrote a large textbook, The Polished Book on Experimental Ophthalmology, divided into two parts, On the Theory of Ophthalmology and Simple and Compounded Ophthalmic Drugs.

Avicenna wrote in his Canon "rescheth", which means "retiformis", and Gerard of Cremona translated this at approximately 1150 into the new term "retina".

=== Early Modern period ===
In the early modern period, medicine increasingly shifted toward specialization. This was a result of building on developments that had begun in the Middle Ages. This shift further emphasized organs and diseases as separate from each other, rather than viewing the body as a whole. Ophthalmology, the medical branch concerning the eye, emerged more clearly as one of these early specialities; specialists were referred to as "oculists." Oculists were often not university-trained physicians, and instead relied on practical and surgical experience. Tensions formed between theory-based learned physicians and hands-on practitioners.

The early modern period included a few key figures. Georg Bartisch (c. 1535-1607) was a German oculist who wrote Ophthalmodouleia, das ist Augendienst (1583). This text contributed greatly to the knowledge of eye diseases and surgery in the sixteenth century. Bartisch became a surgical practitioner despite little formal university education. His work is known for its detailed descriptions of ocular conditions, surgical techniques, and its collection of visual illustrations. Bartisch believed in direct observation and practical experience as a method of teaching.

Another historical figure was the French surgeon Jacques Guillemeau (c. 1550-1613) author of A Worthy Treatise of the Eyes (1587). This text was among the earliest works entirely devoted to ocular diseases, and it is known for its inclusion of the detailed anatomy of the eye and systematic classification of eye diseases. By combining classical authorities and his personal surgical experience, a shift towards observation and empirical practice was shown. Another important figure was Richard Banister (c. 1570-1626), an English oculist and writer known for his detailed descriptions of eye diseases and his emphasis on careful observation of patients. He discussed visual disorders and treatments, and contributed practical surgical knowledge to the field. He represented a shift toward more systematic clinical understanding.

Surgical practices underwent great transformations during this period, although some techniques had been discovered much earlier. One such method was couching, which remained the primary treatment for cataracts throughout the early modern period. In the procedure. a needle was used to displace the opaque cataract lens. This practice did not remove the cataract, but it displaced the obstruction, allowing light to enter the eye. Though often temporary and risky, the practice restored partial vision; this made it appealing to the blind. Despite the continued use of such procedures and a surge in willingness to surgically intervene, surgery remained imprecise.

The interest in eye anatomy grew significantly in the early modern period; as practitioners pushed towards combining classical knowledge with direct observation and surgical experience. Anatomical understanding began evolving through multiple lenses. Oculists, in particular, developed anatomical knowledge through hands-on practice. They relied on tactile experience during procedures such as cataract couching. Figures such as Georg Bartisch created detailed illustrations of the eye, giving a visual approach to learning anatomy. These developments mark a transition in anatomical knowledge away from solely classical ideas, but increasingly towards the combination of observation, illustration, and surgical practice.

Ophthalmology in this period was a transitional phase defined by the emergence of oculists and the creation of the first texts dedicated to eyes. The increasing role of surgery marked a shift toward empirical observation. This period did not complete the formalization of ophthalmology as a medical discipline.

=== Modern period ===
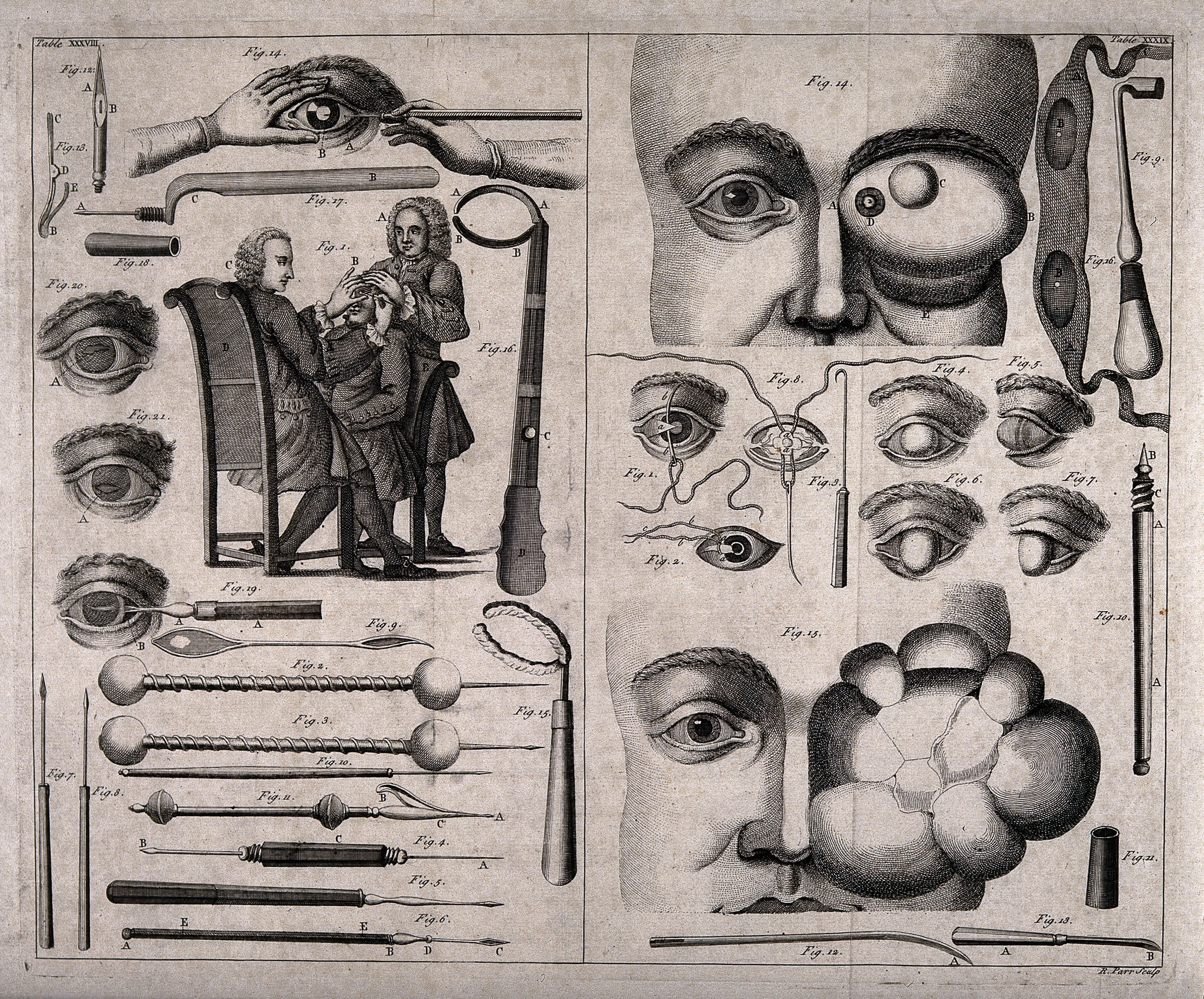
Early ophthalmology instruments

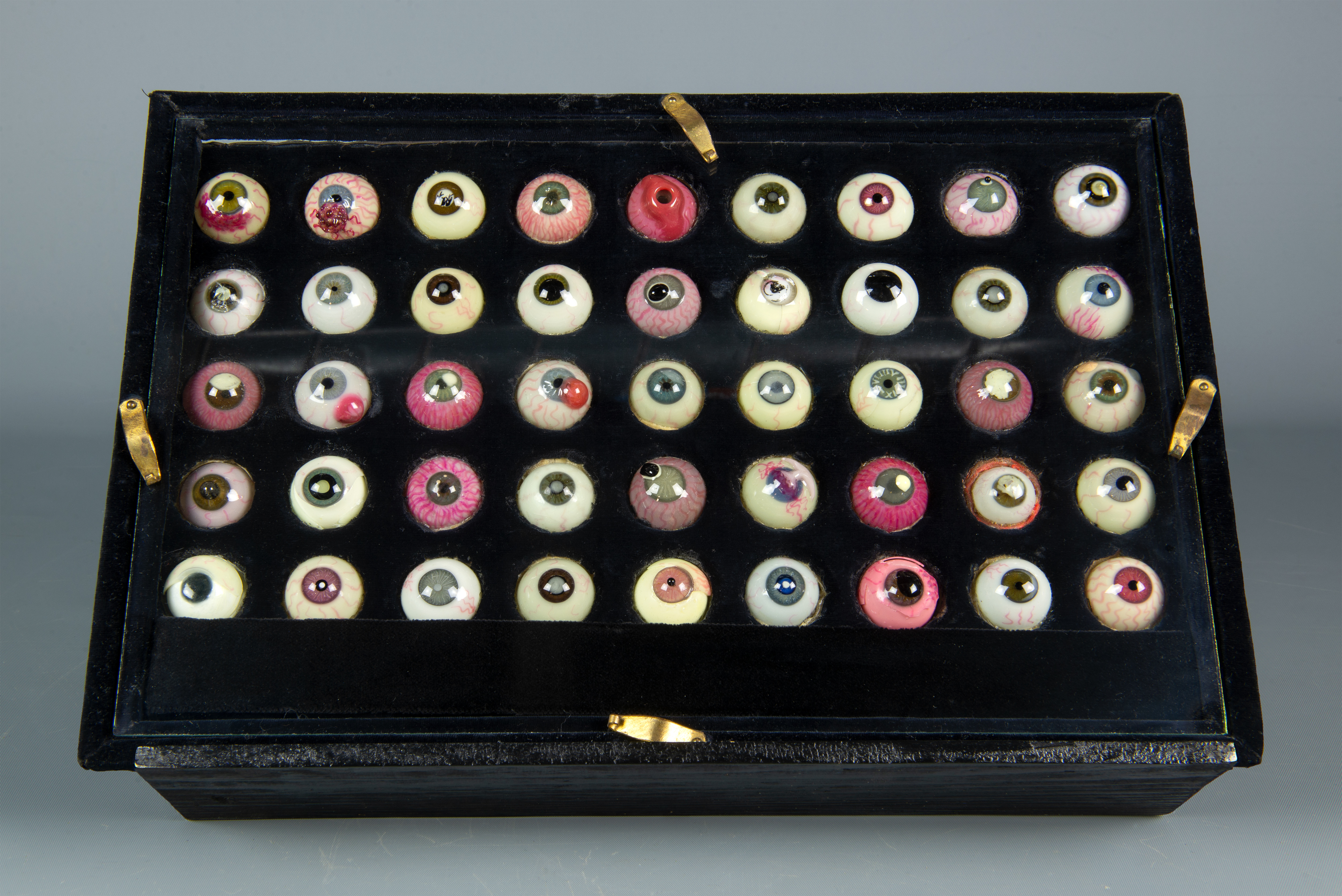
Box of the 18th century containing forty-five glass eyeballs representing a variety of eye pathologies (Sorbonne University).

In the 17th and 18th centuries, hand lenses were used by Malpighi, microscopes by Leeuwenhoek, preparations for fixing the eye for study by Ruysch, and later the freezing of the eye by Petit. This allowed for detailed study of the eye and an advanced model. Some mistakes persisted, such as: why the pupil changed size (seen to be vessels of the iris filling with blood), the existence of the posterior chamber, and the nature of the retina. Unaware of their functions, Leeuwenhoek noted the existence of photoreceptors; however, they were not properly described until Gottfried Reinhold Treviranus in 1834.

Jacques Daviel performed the first documented planned primary cataract extraction on 18 September 1750 in Cologne, and this was announced in the Gazette de Cologne of 22 September 150.

Georg Joseph Beer (1763–1821) was an Austrian ophthalmologist and leader of the First Viennese School of Medicine. He introduced a flap operation for the treatment of cataracts (Beer's operation) and popularized the instrument used to perform the surgery (Beer's knife).

Thomas Pache, of Pache & Son (founded in 1835), supplied all major UK hospitals with high quality artificial eyes, as well as supplying models to universities so that the various examples of diseases and conditions of the eye could be examined by the students.

Pache & Son 1893

In North America, indigenous healers treated some eye diseases by rubbing or scraping the eyes or eyelids.

=== Ophthalmic surgery in the United Kingdom ===
The first ophthalmic surgeon in the UK was John Freke, appointed to the position by the governors of St. Bartholomew's Hospital in 1727. A major breakthrough came with the appointment of Baron de Wenzel (1724–90), a German who became the oculist to King George III of Great Britain in 1772. His skill at removing cataracts legitimized the field. The first dedicated ophthalmic hospital opened in 1805 in London; it is now called Moorfields Eye Hospital. Clinical developments at Moorfields, and the founding of the Institute of Ophthalmology (now part of the University College London) by Sir Stewart Duke-Elder, established the site as the largest eye hospital in the world and a nexus for ophthalmic research.

=== Central Europe ===
In Berlin, ophthalmologist Albrecht von Graefe introduced iridectomy as a treatment for glaucoma and improved cataract surgery, he is also considered the founding father of the German Ophthalmological Society.

Numerous ophthalmologists fled Germany after 1933 as the Nazis began to persecute those of Jewish descent. A representative leader was Joseph Igersheimer (1879–1965), best known for his discoveries with arsphenamine for the treatment of syphilis. He fled to Turkey in 1933. As one of eight emigrant directors in the Faculty of Medicine at the University of Istanbul, he built a modern clinic and trained students. In 1939, he went to the United States, becoming a professor at Tufts University. German ophthalmologist, Gerhard Meyer-Schwickerath is widely credited with developing the predecessor of laser coagulation, photocoagulation.

In 1946, Igersheimer conducted the first experiments on light coagulation. In 1949, he performed the first successful treatment of a retinal detachment with a light beam (light coagulation) with a self-constructed device on the roof of the ophthalmic clinic at the University of Hamburg-Eppendorf.

Polish ophthalmology dates to the 13th century. The Polish Ophthalmological Society was founded in 1911. A representative leader was Adam Zamenhof (1888–1940), who introduced certain diagnostic, surgical, and nonsurgical eye-care procedures. He was executed by the German Nazis in 1940.

Zofia Falkowska (1915–1993) head of the Faculty and Clinic of Ophthalmology in Warsaw from 1963 to 1976, was the first to use lasers in her practice.

=== Contributions by physicists ===
The prominent physicists of the late 19th and early 20th centuries included Ernst Abbe (1840–1905), a co-owner of at the Zeiss Jena factories in Germany, where he developed numerous optical instruments. Hermann von Helmholtz (1821–1894) was a polymath who made contributions to many fields of science and invented the ophthalmoscope in 1851. They both made theoretical calculations on image formation in optical systems and studied the optics of the eye.

== Professional requirements ==
Ophthalmologists are physicians (MD/DO in the U.S. or MBBS in the UK and elsewhere, or DO/DOMS/DNB) who typically complete an undergraduate degree at general medical school, followed by a residency in ophthalmology. Ophthalmologists typically perform optical, medical and surgical eye care.

=== Australia and New Zealand ===
In Australia and New Zealand, the FRACO or FRANZCO is the equivalent postgraduate specialist qualification. The structured training system takes place over five years of postgraduate training. Overseas-trained ophthalmologists are assessed using the pathway published on the RANZCO website. Those who have completed their formal training in the UK and have the CCST or CCT, usually are deemed to be comparable.

=== Bangladesh ===
In Bangladesh to be an ophthalmologist the basic degree is an MBBS. They then have to obtain a postgraduate degree or diploma in an ophthalmology specialty. In Bangladesh, these are diploma in ophthalmology, diploma in community ophthalmology, fellow or member of the College of Physicians and Surgeons in ophthalmology, and Master of Science in ophthalmology.

=== Canada ===
In Canada, after medical school an ophthalmology residency is undertaken. The residency typically lasts five years, culminating in fellowship of the Royal College of Surgeons of Canada (FRCSC). Subspecialty training is undertaken by approximately 30% of fellows (FRCSC) in a variety of fields from anterior segment, cornea, glaucoma, vision rehabilitation, uveitis, oculoplastics, medical and surgical retina, ocular oncology, Ocular pathology, or neuro-ophthalmology. Approximately 35 vacancies open per year for ophthalmology residency training in all of Canada. These numbers fluctuate per year, ranging from 30 to 37 spots. Of these, up to ten spots are at French-speaking universities in Quebec. At the end of the five years, the graduating ophthalmologist must pass the oral and written portions of the Royal College exam in either English or French.

=== India ===
In India, after completing MBBS degree, postgraduate study in ophthalmology is required. The degrees are doctor of medicine, master of surgery, diploma in ophthalmic medicine and surgery, and diplomate of national board. The concurrent training and work experience are in the form of a junior residency at a medical college, eye hospital, or institution under the supervision of experienced faculty. Further work experience in the form of fellowship, registrar, or senior resident refines the skills of these eye surgeons. All members of the India Ophthalmologist Society and various state-level ophthalmologist societies hold regular conferences and actively promote continuing medical education.

=== Nepal ===
In Nepal, to become an ophthalmologist, three years of postgraduate study is required after completing an MBBS degree. The postgraduate degree in ophthalmology is called medical doctor in ophthalmology. Currently, this degree is provided by Tilganga Institute of Ophthalmology, Tilganga, Kathmandu, BPKLCO, Institute of Medicine, TU, Kathmandu, BP Koirala Institute of Health Sciences, Dharan, Kathmandu University, Dhulikhel, and National Academy of Medical Science, Kathmandu. A few Nepalese citizens also study this subject in Bangladesh, China, India, Pakistan, and other countries. All graduates have to pass the Nepal Medical Council Licensing Exam to become a registered ophthalmologists in Nepal. The concurrent residency training is in the form of a PG student (resident) at a medical college, eye hospital, or institution according to the degree providing university's rules and regulations. Nepal Ophthalmic Society holds regular conferences and actively promotes continuing medical education.

=== Ireland ===
In Ireland, the Royal College of Surgeons of Ireland grants membership (MRCSI (Ophth)) and fellowship (FRCSI (Ophth)) qualifications in conjunction with the Irish College of Ophthalmologists. Total postgraduate training involves an intern year, a minimum of three years of basic surgical training, and a further 4.5 years of higher surgical training. Clinical training takes place within public, Health Service Executive-funded hospitals in Dublin, Sligo, Limerick, Galway, Waterford, and Cork. A minimum of 8.5 years of training is required before eligibility to work in consultant posts. Some trainees take extra time to obtain MSc, MD or PhD degrees and to undertake clinical fellowships in the UK, Australia, and the United States.

=== Pakistan ===
In Pakistan, after MBBS, a four-year full-time residency program leads to an exit-level FCPS examination in ophthalmology, held under the auspices of the College of Physicians and Surgeons, Pakistan. The tough examination is assessed by both highly qualified Pakistani and eminent international ophthalmic consultants. As a prerequisite to the final examinations, an intermediate module, an optics and refraction module, and a dissertation written on a research project carried out under supervision is also assessed.

Moreover, a two-and-a-half-year residency program leads to an MCPS while a two-year training of DOMS is also being offered. For candidates in the military, a stringent two-year graded course, with quarterly assessments, is held under Armed Forces Post Graduate Medical Institute in Rawalpindi.

The M.S. in ophthalmology is also one of the specialty programs. In addition to programs for physicians, various diplomas and degrees for allied eyecare personnel are also being offered to produce competent optometrists, orthoptists, ophthalmic nurses, ophthalmic technologists, and ophthalmic technicians in this field. These programs are being offered, notably by the College of Ophthalmology and Allied Vision Sciences in Lahore and the Pakistan Institute of Community Ophthalmology in Peshawar. Subspecialty fellowships also are being offered in the fields of pediatric ophthalmology and vitreoretinal ophthalmology. King Edward Medical University, Al Shifa Trust Eye Hospital Rawalpindi, and Al- Ibrahim Eye Hospital Karachi also have started a degree program in this field.

=== Philippines ===
In the Philippines, Ophthalmology is considered a medical specialty that uses medicine and surgery to treat diseases of the eye. There is only one professional organization in the country that is duly recognized by the PMA and the PCS: the Philippine Academy of Ophthalmology (PAO). PAO and the state-standard Philippine Board of Ophthalmology (PBO) regulates ophthalmology residency programs and board certification. To become a general ophthalmologist in the Philippines, a candidate must have completed a doctor of medicine degree (MD) or its equivalent (e.g. MBBS), have completed an internship in Medicine, have passed the physician licensure exam, and have completed residency training at a hospital accredited by the Philippine Board of Ophthalmology (accrediting arm of PAO). Attainment of board certification in ophthalmology from the PBO is essential in acquiring privileges in most major health institutions. Graduates of residency programs can receive further training in ophthalmology subspecialties, such as neuro-ophthalmology, retina, etc. by completing a fellowship program that varies in length depending on each program's requirements.

=== United Kingdom ===
In the United Kingdom, three colleges grant postgraduate degrees in ophthalmology. The Royal College of Ophthalmologists (RCOphth) and the Royal College of Surgeons of Edinburgh grant MRCOphth/FRCOphth and MRCSEd/FRCSEd, (although membership is no longer a prerequisite for fellowship), the Royal College of Glasgow grants FRCS. Postgraduates work as a specialist registrar, and one of these degrees is required for specialization in eye diseases. Such clinical work is within the NHS, with supplementary private work for some consultants.

Only 2.3 ophthalmologists exist per 100,000 population in the UK – fewer pro rata than in any nations in the European Union.

=== United States ===
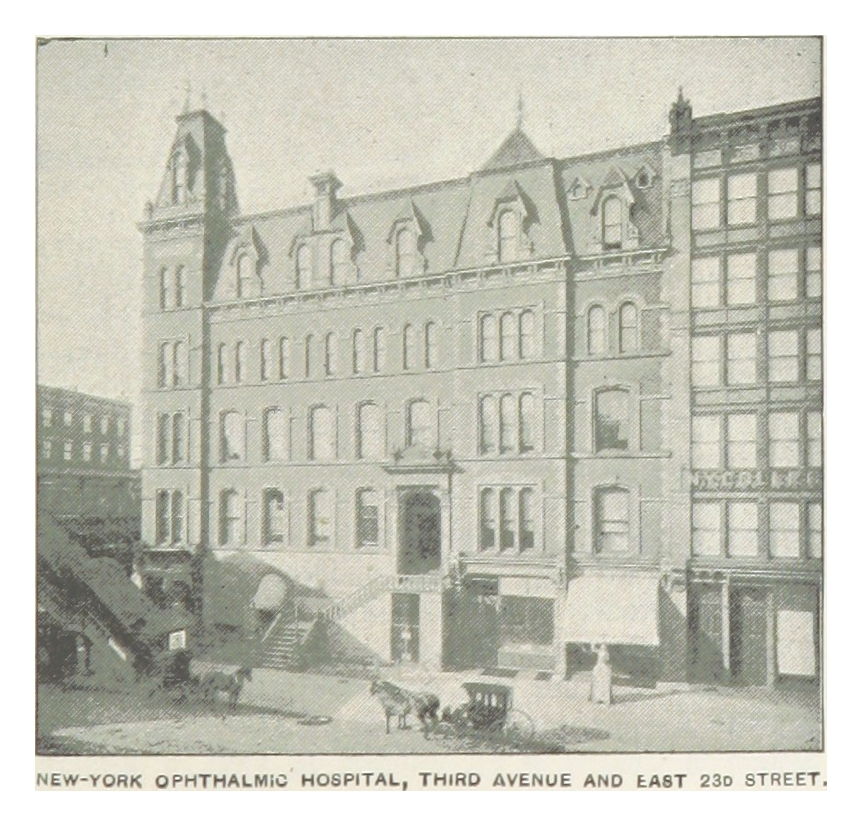
New York Ophthalmic Hospital, 1893

Ophthalmologists typically complete four years of undergraduate studies, four years of medical school, and four years of eye-specific training (residency). Some pursue additional training, known as a fellowship – typically one to two years. Ophthalmologists are physicians who specialize in the eye and related structures. They perform medical and surgical eye care and may also write prescriptions for corrective lenses. They often manage late-stage eye disease, which typically involves surgery.

Ophthalmologists must complete the requirements of continuing medical education to maintain licensure and for recertification.

== Notable ophthalmologists ==
The following is a list of physicians who have significantly contributed to the field of ophthalmology:

=== 18th–19th centuries ===
- Theodor Leber (1840–1917) discovered Leber's congenital amaurosis, Leber's hereditary optic neuropathy, Leber's miliary aneurysm, and Leber's stellate neuroretinitis.
- Carl Ferdinand von Arlt (1812–1887), the elder (Austrian), proved that myopia is largely due to an excessive axial length, published influential textbooks on eye disease, and ran annual eye clinics in needy areas long before the concept of volunteer eye camps became popular; his name is still attached to some disease signs, e.g., von Arlt's line in trachoma and his son, Ferdinand Ritter von Arlt, the younger, was also an ophthalmologist.
- Jacques Daviel (1696–1762) (France) performed the first documented planned primary cataract extraction on 18 September 1750 in Cologne.
- Franciscus Donders (1818–1889) (Dutch) published pioneering analyses of ocular biomechanics, intraocular pressure, glaucoma, and physiological optics, and he made possible the prescribing of combinations of spherical and cylindrical lenses to treat astigmatism.
- Joseph Forlenze (1757–1833) (Italy), specialist in cataract surgery, became popular during the First French Empire, healing, among many, personalities such as the minister Jean-Étienne-Marie Portalis and the poet Ponce Denis Lebrun; he was nominated by Napoleon "chirurgien oculiste of the lycees, the civil hospices and all the charitable institutions of the departments of the Empire", and he was known for his free interventions, mainly in favor of poor people.
- Louis-Auguste Desmarres (1810–1882), has a number of Opthalomogical surgical instruments named after him.

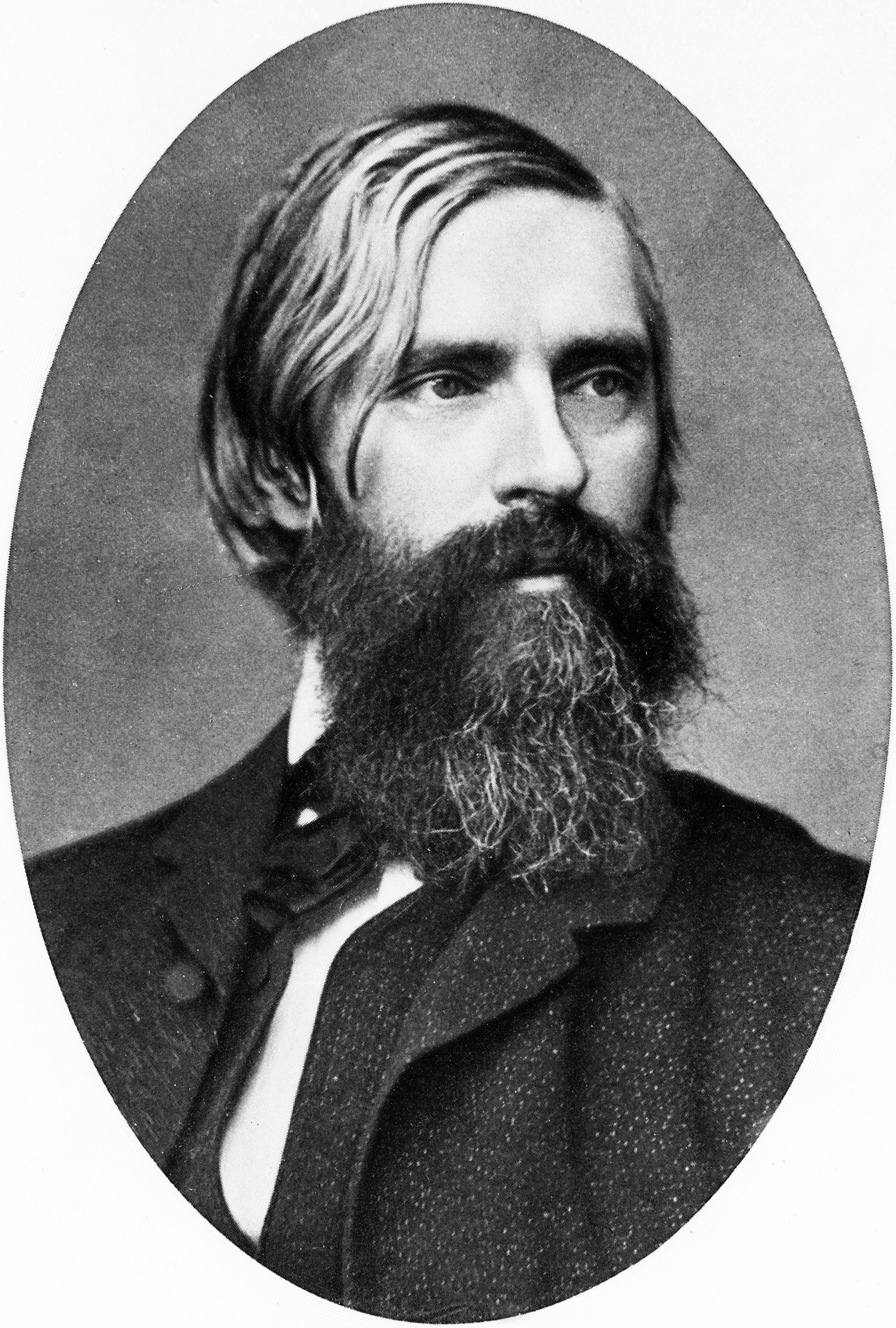
Albrecht von Graefe

- Albrecht von Graefe (1828–1870) (Germany) probably the most important ophthalmologist of the 19th century, along with Helmholtz and Donders, one of the 'founding fathers' of ophthalmology as a specialty, he was a brilliant clinician and charismatic teacher who had an international influence on the development of ophthalmology, and was a pioneer in mapping visual field defects and diagnosis and treatment of glaucoma, and he introduced a cataract extraction technique that remained the standard for more than 100 years, and many other important surgical techniques such as iridectomy. He rationalized the use of many ophthalmically important drugs, including mydriatics and miotics; he was the founder of one of the earliest ophthalmic societies (German Ophthalmological Society, 1857) and one of the earliest ophthalmic journals (Graefe's Archives of Ophthalmology).
- Louis Émile Javal (1839–1907), remembered for his studies of physiological optics and strabismus.
- Henri Parinaud (1844–1905), most noted for his work in the field of neuro-ophthalmology.

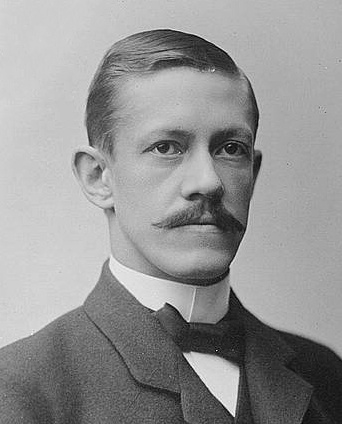
Allvar Gullstrand

- Allvar Gullstrand (1862–1930) (Sweden) was a Nobel Prize-winner in 1911 for his research on the eye as a light-refracting apparatus; he described the 'schematic eye', a mathematical model of the human eye based on his measurements known as the 'optical constants' of the eye; his measurements are still used today.
- Hermann von Helmholtz (1821–1894), a great German polymath, invented the ophthalmoscope (1851) and published important work on physiological optics, including color vision.
- Julius Hirschberg (1843–1925) (Germany) in 1879 became the first to use an electromagnet to remove metallic foreign bodies from the eye and in 1886 developed the Hirschberg test for measuring strabismus.
- Rosa Kerschbaumer-Putjata (1851–1923), Russian-Austrian ophthalmologist who was the first female doctor in Austria, headed "mobile ophthalmological troops" in Russia and reduced the above-average number of blind people in Salzburg where she ran a private eye clinic.
- Herman Snellen (1834–1908) (Netherlands) introduced the Snellen chart to study visual acuity.

=== 20th–21st centuries ===
- Vladimir Petrovich Filatov (1875–1956) (Russia) contributed the tube flap grafting method, corneal transplantation, and preservation of grafts from cadaver eyes and tissue therapy; he founded the Filatov Institute of Eye Diseases and Tissue Therapy, Odessa, one of the leading eye-care institutes in the world.
- Shinobu Ishihara (1879–1963) (Japan), in 1918, invented the Ishihara Color Vision Test, a common method for determining color blindness; he also made major contributions to the study of trachoma and myopia.
- Ignacio Barraquer (1884–1965) (Spain), in 1917, invented the first motorized vacuum instrument (erisophake) for intracapsular cataract extraction; he founded the Barraquer Clinic in 1941 and the Barraquer Institute in 1947 in Barcelona.
- Ernst Fuchs (1851–1930) was an Austrian ophthalmologist known for his discovery and description of numerous ocular diseases and abnormalities including Fuchs' dystrophy and Fuchs heterochromic iridocyclitis.
- Tsutomu Sato (1902–1960) (Japan) pioneer in incisional refractive surgery, including techniques for astigmatism and the invention of radial keratotomy for myopia.
- Jules Gonin (1870–1935) (Switzerland) was the "father of retinal detachment surgery".
- Sir Harold Ridley (1906–2001) (United Kingdom), in 1949, may have been the first to successfully implant an artificial intraocular lens after observing that plastic fragments in the eyes of wartime pilots were well tolerated; he fought for decades against strong reactionary opinions to have the concept accepted as feasible and useful.
- Charles Schepens (1912–2006) (Belgium) was the "father of modern retinal surgery" and developer of the Schepens indirect binocular ophthalmoscope whilst at Moorfields Eye Hospital; he was the founder of the Schepens Eye Research Institute, associated with Harvard Medical School and the Massachusetts Eye and Ear Infirmary, in Boston, Massachusetts.
- Marshall M. Parks (1918–2005) (United States) was the "father of pediatric ophthalmology".
- José Ignacio Barraquer (1916–1998) (Spain) was the "father of modern refractive surgery" and in the 1960s he developed lamellar techniques, including keratomileusis and keratophakia, as well as the first microkeratome and corneal microlathe.
- Tadeusz Krwawicz (1910–1988) (Poland), in 1961, developed the first cryoprobe for intracapsular cataract extraction.
- Svyatoslav Fyodorov (1927–2000) (Russia) was the "father of ophthalmic microsurgery"; he improved and popularized radial keratotomy, invented a surgical cure for cataract, and developed scleroplasty.
- Charles Kelman (1930–2004) (United States) developed the ultrasound and mechanized irrigation and aspiration system for phacoemulsification, first allowing cataract extraction through a small incision.

== See also ==
- American Academy of Ophthalmology
- Association for Research in Vision and Ophthalmology
- Book of the Ten Treatises of the Eye
- Chinese ophthalmology
- Copiale cipher
- European Board of Ophthalmology
- Eye care professional
- EyeWiki
- List of systemic diseases with ocular manifestations
- Orthoptics

== Bibliography ==
- Christopher Leffler (ed.), Biographies of Ophthalmologists from Around the World: Ancient, Medieval, and Early Modern, 2024, pp. 384, ISBN 9798342679220 Available from: https://www.researchgate.net/publication/392094663_Biographies_of_Ophthalmologists_from_Around_the_World_Ancient_Medieval_and_Early_Modern
