= François Pourfour du Petit =

French anatomist, ophthalmologist and surgeon

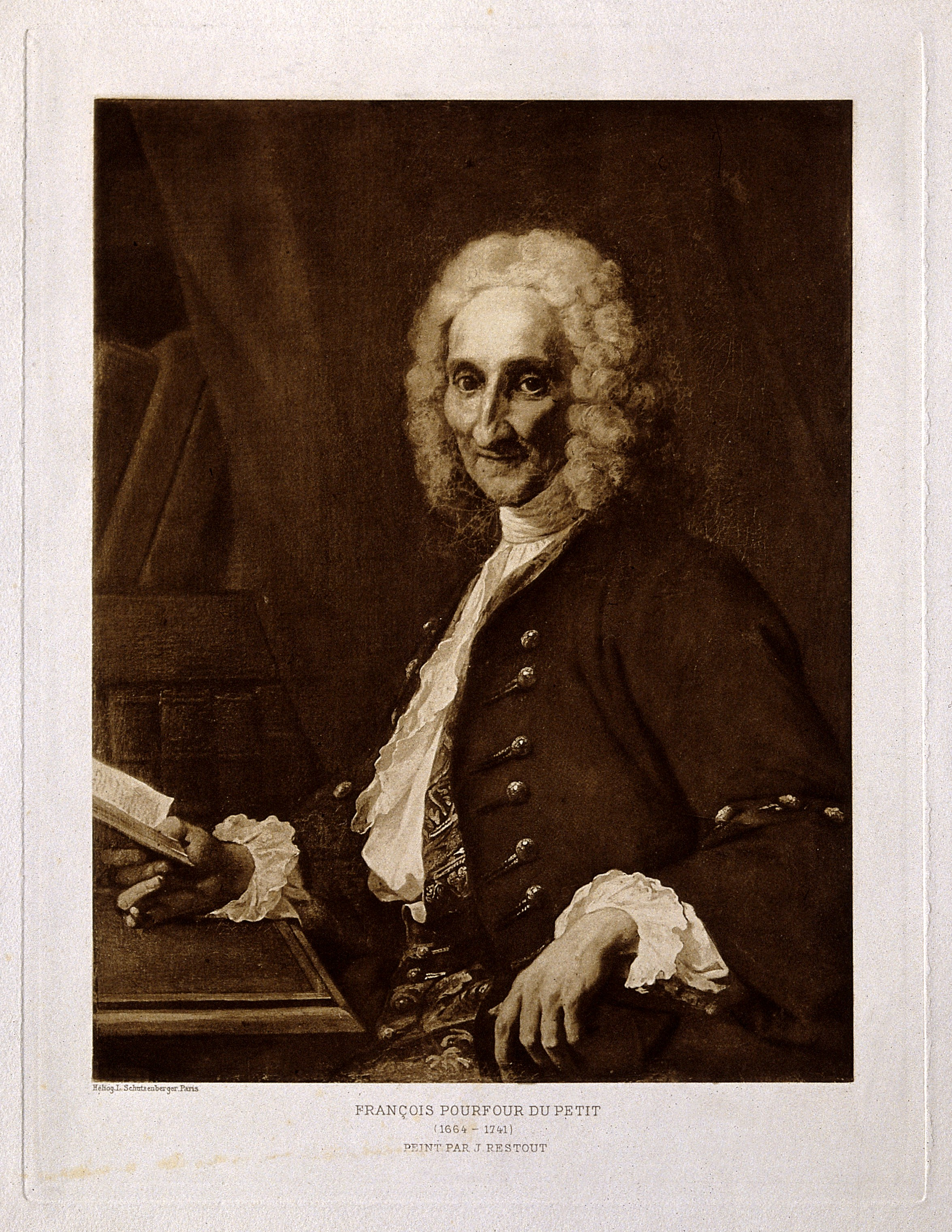
- Born: 24 June 1664
- Died: 18 June 1741 (aged 76)

François Pourfour du Petit (French: [fʁɑ̃swa puʁfuʁ dy pəti]; 24 June 1664 – 18 June 1741) was a French anatomist, ophthalmologist and surgeon who conducted careful anatomical studies of the human eye. He also conducted early experiments in neurology.

Petit was born in Paris and was orphaned at an early age. He studied the classics at the College de Beauvais before studies in Belgium and Germany. He then studied medicine at the University of Montpellier, and afterwards surgery at the Hôpital de la Charité in Paris. During this period of time he also attended lectures by Guichard Joseph Duverney (1648–1730) in anatomy and Joseph Pitton de Tournefort (1656–1708) in botany. Between 1693 and 1713 he was a military physician in the armies of Louis XIV, and after the Peace of Utrecht (1713), he returned to Paris as an eye specialist. He conducted many cataract surgeries using the technique of displacing the lens using a needle and influenced Jacques Daviel approach to cataract treatment. He made careful measurements and used biometrical approaches to understanding the eye. He was among the first to note changes in the shape of the lens with age. From 1722 to 1741 he was a member of the Académie Royale des Sciences: associate member chemist and anatomist in 1722, then resident member anatomist in 1725.

Petit is remembered for his detailed anatomical studies of the eye, as well as physiological research of the sympathetic nervous system. As a military physician, Petit noticed that there was a striking correlation between soldiers' head wounds and contralateral motor effects, which he documented in a 1710 treatise called Lettres d’un medecin des hopitaux du roi a un autre medecin de ses amis. He was able to conduct ablations in dogs and produce similar effects. He performed pioneer investigations on the internal structure of the spinal cord, and gave an early, detailed description of the decussation of the pyramids. He also provided the first clinical description of symptoms of the rare Pourfour du Petit syndrome, which is thought to be closely related to Horner's syndrome, and also known as reverse Horner syndrome because of its clinical features of mydriasis, eyelid retraction and hyperhidrosis.

== Associated eponyms ==
Neuro-ophthalmic syndrome named for Petit:

- Pourfour du Petit Syndrome: a rare cause of unilateral mydriasis, lid retraction, exophthalmos, and hyperhidrosis

Anatomical features named after Petit include:

- Petit's canals: Also known as spatia zonularia, lymph-filled spaces between the fibers of the ciliary zonule at the equator of the lens of the eye.
- Petit's sinuses: Also known as aortic sinuses, the space between each semilunar valve and the wall of the aorta.
