= ICO Ophthalmic Pathology Award =

The Ophthalmic Pathology Award is an international award given to one ophthalmic pathologist every four years by the International Council of Ophthalmology to encourage scientists and researchers working in this field, with clinical relevance (i.e., ophthalmic pathology, imaging and disease mechanisms). The award, which presently amounts to 20,000 USD, is presented during the opening ceremony of the World Ophthalmology Congress. It is said to recognize "outstanding research in the field of ophthalmic pathology."

The award is sponsored by the Gottfried und Lieselotte Naumann-Stiftung, Germany, and is administered with the support and cooperation of the German Ophthalmological Society. Candidates can be recommended by scientific societies and may also submit their applications personally whereafter an international scientific advisory board consisting of seven members will establish a triple list of candidates, ranked by priority. The final selection will be made by the board of trustees of the International Council of Ophthalmology.

Following the award ceremony, the awardee will give the 'Ophthalmic Pathology Award Lecture' at the World Ophthalmology Congress and, later, the 'Naumann Lecture' at the following congress of the German Ophthalmological Society in Berlin in honour of the late professor Gottfried O.H. Naumann, the creator of the Ophthalmic Pathology Award together with his wife when he was the President of the International Council of Ophthalmology.

== Recipients ==
Source: International Council of Ophthalmology

- 2026: Hans Grossniklaus, Atlanta, USA
- 2022: Tero Kivelä, Helsinki, Finland
- 2018: Sarah Coupland, Liverpool, UK
- 2014: Mark Tso, Baltimore, USA
- 2010: Ursula Schlötzer-Schrehardt, Erlangen, Germany
- 2006: Thaddeus Dryja, Boston, USA

== See also ==
- List of medicine awards
