= College of Ophthalmology and Allied Vision Sciences =

College of Ophthalmology & Allied Vision Sciences
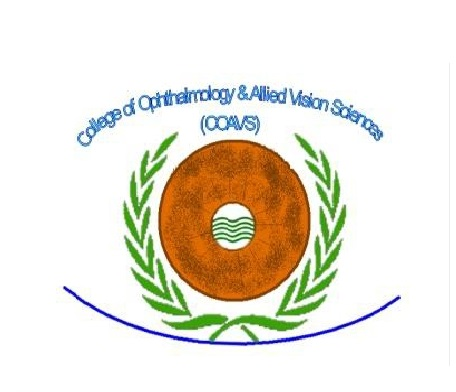
- Motto: "Visio Novo"
- Type: public
- Established: 2004
- Principal: Prof. Dr. Zahid Kamal Siddiqui
- Location: Lahore, Punjab, Pakistan
- Affiliations: KEMU
- Website: Official website

College of Ophthalmology and Allied Vision Sciences (COAVS) (Urdu: کالج آف آفتھلمالوجی اینڈ ایلائیڈ ویژن سائنسز) formerly known as Punjab institute of Preventive Ophthalmology (PIPO) is one of the finest Ophthalmic Institute in Pakistan. it is attached with Mayo Hospital which was built in 1872 and was named after Lord Mack Mayo and King Edward Medical University which was built in 1860 and was named after King Edward.

== History ==
In December 1998, Prof Asad Aslam Khan in collaboration with The Fred Hollows Foundation conducted a detailed situation analysis of ophthalmic services available at district level in Punjab. The analysis revealed that the number of ophthalmologists was much less than the required number and no trained ophthalmic paramedic or ophthalmic nurse was available at district level.

In response to the report of the situation analysis, with the intention to improve eye health services in the province, the Punjab health department established a Comprehensive Eye Care Cell (CEC Cell) at Mayo Hospital. In the year 2004, Government of the Punjab, with the addition of teaching faculty for mid-level eye care workers, upgraded it to Punjab Institute of Preventive Ophthalmology (PIPO) to eradicate preventable blindness from the Pakistan.

Observing the tremendous success and achievements of Punjab Institute of Preventive Ophthalmology (PIPO) and in view to start postgraduate and subspecialty courses in Ophthalmology and Allied Vision Sciences, Govt. of Punjab, in 2007, elevated PIPO to College of Ophthalmology & Allied Vision Sciences (COAVS).

== Departments ==
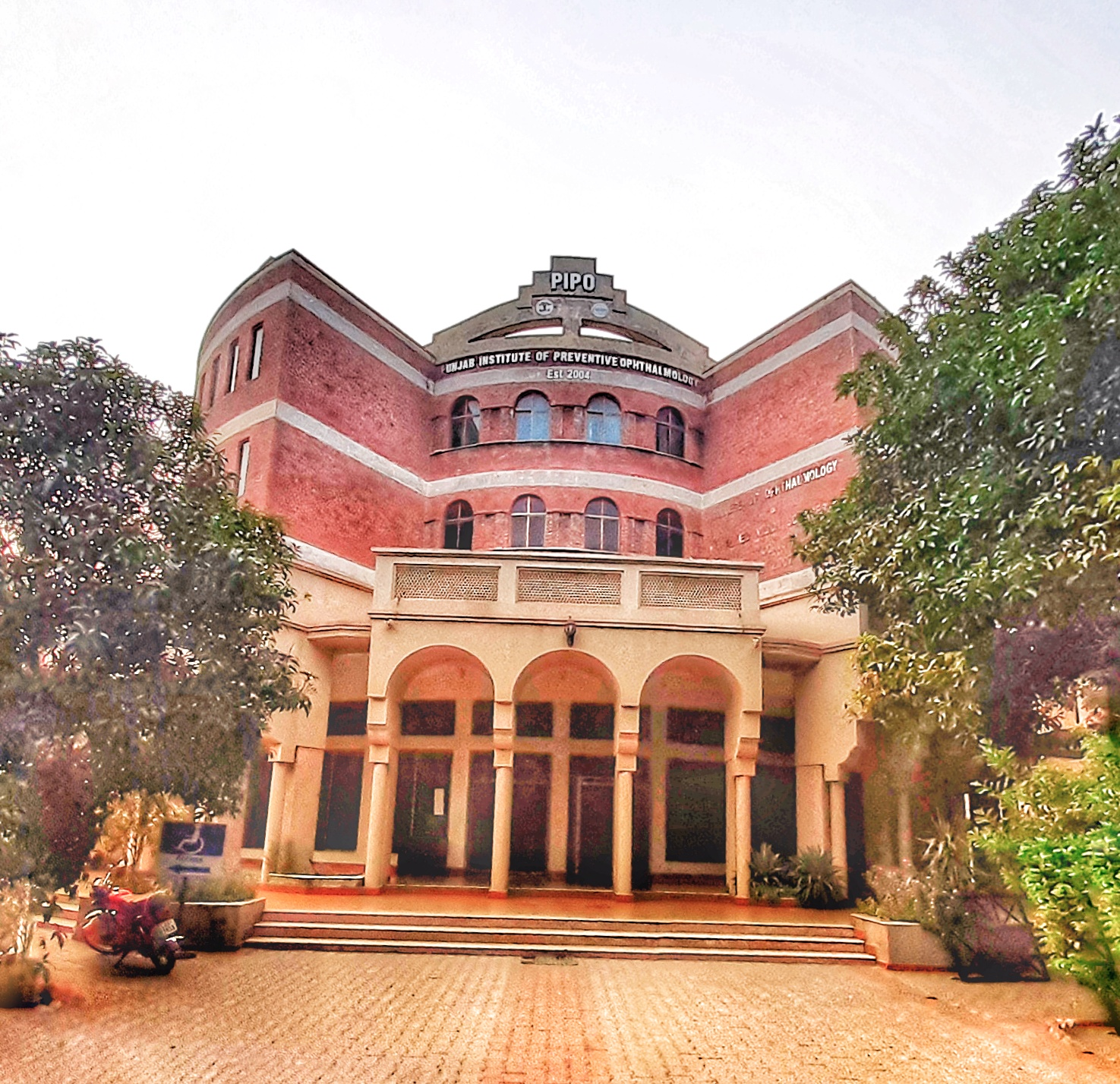
COAVS, KEMU

- Refraction
- Low Vision
- Optical Dispensing Lab
- Contact Lens Lab
- Community Ophthalmology
- Vitreoretina
- Pediatric ophthalmology
- Diagnostic Ophthalmology
- Glaucoma & Diagnostic Research
- Research and development
- Ophthalmic pathology & Microbiology
- Information Technology Center
- Information Education & Communication Cell

=== Auxiliary services ===
Library

- Computer labs

=== Attached hostel facilities ===
- Boys Hostel
- Girls Hostel

== Director General/Principal ==
- Prof. Dr. Asad Aslam Khan (2004- 2021)
- Prof. Dr. Muhammad Suhail Sarwar (2021-2022)
- Prof. Dr. Zahid Kamal Siddiqui (2022-2023)
- Prof. Dr. Muhammad Moeen (2023-present)

== Academic Degrees Offered ==
Undergraduate

- BS (Hons) Vision Sciences, Optometry.
- BS (Hons) Vision Sciences, Orthoptics.
- BS (Hons) Vision Sciences, Investigative Ophthalmology.
- Ophthalmic Technology Diploma

Nursing

- Diploma in Ophthalmic Nursing

Ophthalmologist

- Fellowship in Vitreoretina
- Fellowship in Pediatric Ophthalmology
- Refresher course for District Ophthalmologist
- Short course in Diagnostic Ophthalmology
- Short course in Laser application
- Short course in Phacoemulcification
- Short course in manual small incision cataract surgery

== Student Societies ==
- Vision Dramatic Society (VDS)
- Vision Literary Society (VLS)
- Vision Debating Society (VDS)
- Vision Photography & Filmography Society (VPFS)
- COAVS Sports Club
