= Abraham of Lérida =

Jewish physician and astrologer

Abraham of Lérida was a Jewish physician, surgeon and astrologer. On September 12, 1468, he couched a cataract in the right eye of King John II of Aragon, and afterward was equally successful with the left eye.
