= Jacques Daviel =

French ophthalmologist

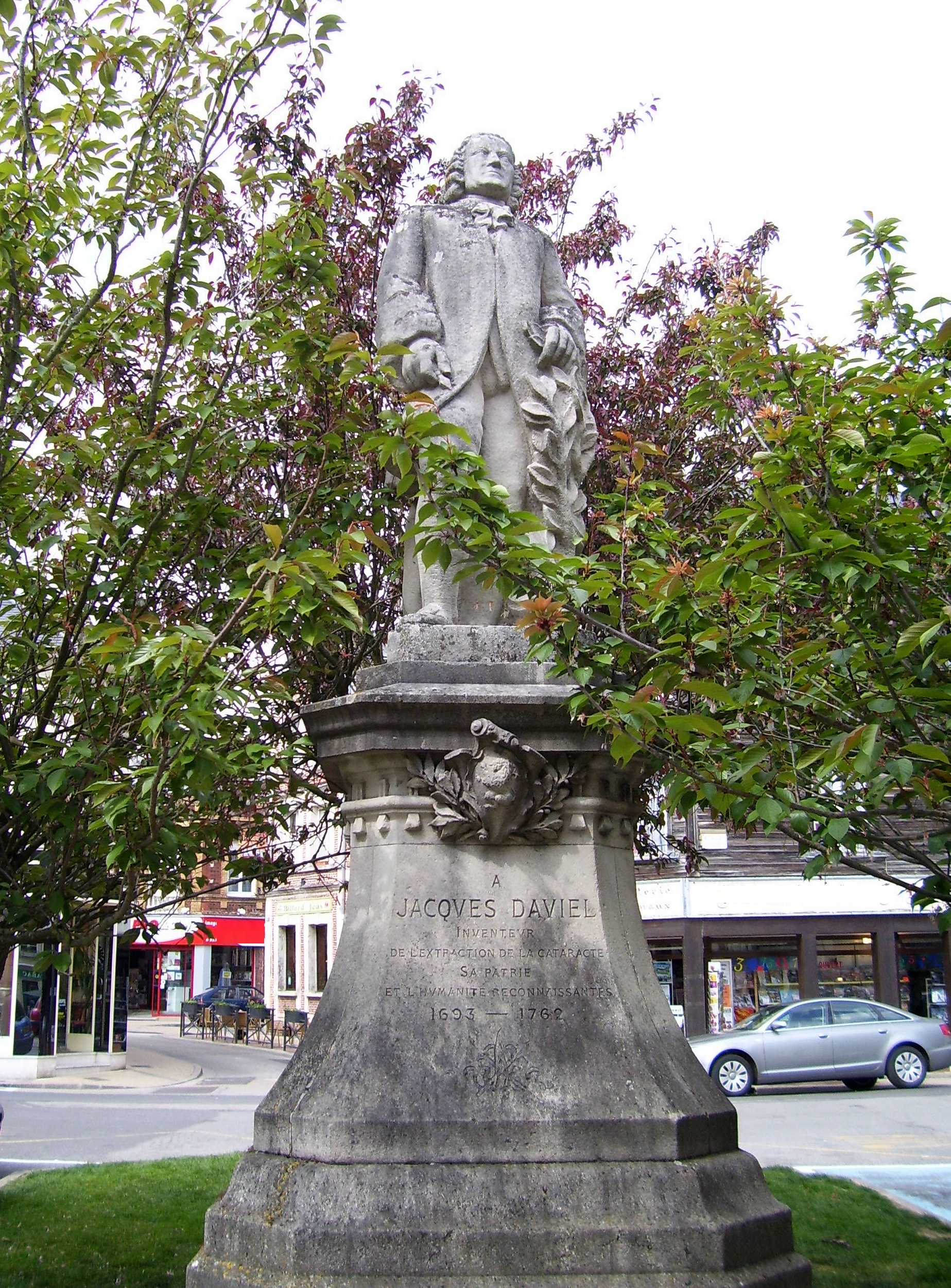
monument to Jacques Daviel in Bernay

Jacques Daviel (11 August 1696 – 30 September 1762) was a French ophthalmologist credited with originating the first significant advance in cataract surgery since couching was invented in antiquity. Daviel performed the first documented planned primary extracapsular cataract extraction on 18 September 1750 in Cologne on a clerical official named Gilles Noupres.

Daviel earned his medical degree from the Medical School of Rouen, in the Province of Normandy. He practiced in Marseille, Province of Provence, where he was affiliated with the medical school there, then restricted his practice to ophthalmology in 1728. He was on the staff of Hospital d'Invalides and became oculist to Louis XV.

Daviel's sustained effort to commit to cataract extraction, as opposed to couching, seems to have begun in the first week of July 1750, when three Paris-based surgeons, including Daviel, began to pursue or experiment with cataract extraction. Daviel performed his first documented planned primary cataract extraction on a clergyman on Sep. 18, 1750 in Cologne, and this was announced in the Gazette de Cologne on Sep. 22, 1750.

In March 1756 he was elected a Fellow of the Royal Society. In 1759, he was elected a foreign member of the Royal Swedish Academy of Sciences.

Daviel died of apoplexy in 1762 while on a trip to Geneva, Switzerland.
