= Pourfour du Petit syndrome =

Rare disorder affecting the eye

Pourfour du Petit syndrome (PdPs) is a rare cause of unilateral mydriasis, lid retraction, exophthalmos, and hyperhidrosis.

PdPs is typically caused by trauma or tumors that irritate the cervical sympathetic chain, causing ipsilateral symptoms. Clinically it can be thought of as the opposite of Horner's syndrome, which causes miosis due to interruption of the sympathetics. It is thought to be much rarer than Horner's syndrome because only some lesions are able to stimulate the carotid nerve plexus.

Pourfour du Petit syndrome has been reported in association with tumors, carotid artery dissections, neck trauma, or iatrogenic causes such as carotid surgeries or nerve blocks.

PdPs was described in 1727 by François Pourfour du Petit (1664–1741), a French military surgeon who extensively studied the sympathetic pathways in the neck.
