= Couching (ophthalmology) =

Earliest known cataract surgery

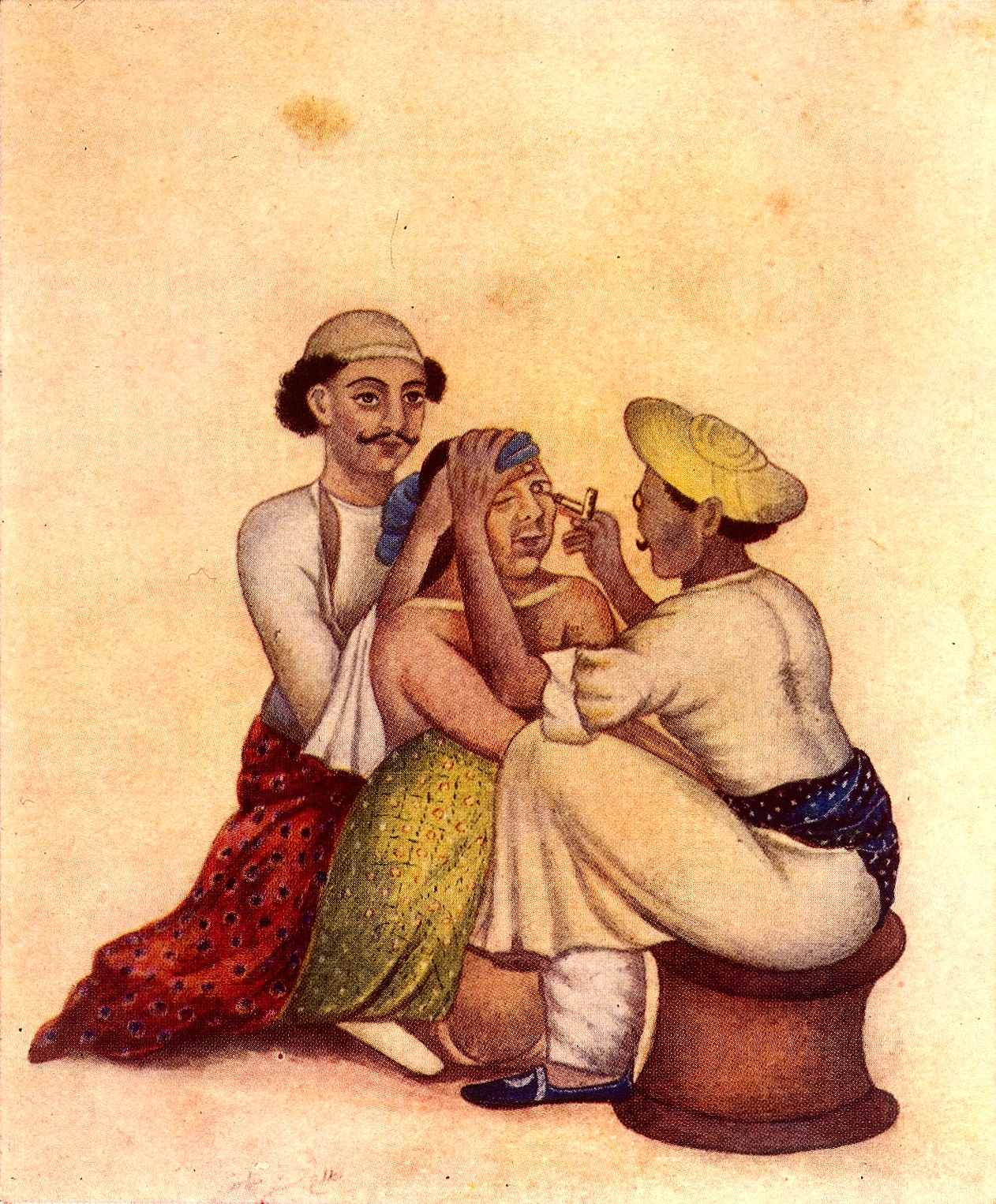
"Couching for cataract"; Wellcome Collection illustration of Indian doctors performing the technique.

Couching is the earliest documented form of cataract surgery. It involves dislodging the lens of the eye, thus removing the cloudiness caused by the cataract, resulting in aphakia. Couching was a precursor to modern cataract surgery and pars plana vitrectomy.

== History ==
The Code of Hammurabi (1755–1750 BC) contains the earliest reference to the surgical procedure known as couching. The code also details the first recorded sliding scale for medical fees, linking the payment to a patient's wealth. A surgeon who successfully performed eye surgery with a bronze lancet would receive 10 silver shekels for a patrician, five for a plebeian, and two for a slave. This indicates that couching is one of the most ancient surgical procedures.

The first reference to cataract and its surgical treatment in Europe are found in the writings of Chrysippus of Soli (c. 279 – c. 206 BC). The procedure was described in detail in the encyclopedia De Medicina, by the author Celsus (ca. 25 BC to 50 AD).

The procedure was described in detail in the Indian medical treatise Sushruta Samhita, in the third volume, entitled the Uttara Tantra, which is attributed, in the traditions of both India and China, to a figure named Nagarjuna of the early Common Era. Evidence shows that couching was practiced in China, Europe and Africa. After the 19th century AD, with the development of modern cataract surgery (extraction of lens (1750)), couching fell out of fashion over the next century, though it is still used in parts of Asia and Africa.

Couching was practiced in ancient India. The Sushruta Samhita's Uttaratantra section (Note: chapter 17, verses 55–69) describes an operation in which a curved needle was used to push the opaque "phlegmatic matter" (Note: kapha in Sanskrit) in the eye out of the way of vision. The eye would later be soaked with warm, clarified butter and then bandaged. Here is a translation from the original Sanskrit:

"At a time that is neither too hot or too cold, the patient who has been oiled and sweated is restrained and seated, looking symmetrically at his own nose. The wise physician should separate (muktvā) two white sections from the black part (kṛṣṇa) and from the outer corner of the eye (apāṅga). Then he should press (pīḍ-) properly into the eye, at the naturally occurring (daivakṛte) opening (chidra) with a probe (śalākā) made of copper or iron, with a tip like a barley-corn, held by a steady hand with the middle finger, forefinger and thumb, the left one with the right hand and the other one contrariwise. When the piercing is done properly, there is the issue of a drop of liquid and a sound. The expert should moisten the exact place of piercing with a woman's breast-milk. Then he should scratch the circuit of the pupil (dṛṣṭimaṇḍala) with the tip of the probe (śalākā). Without injuring, gently pushing the phlegm in the circuit of the pupil against the nose, he should remove it by means of sniffing (ucchiṅgana)."

Cataract couching began to gradually be replaced by cataract extraction after 1752, when Jacques Daviel of Paris presented his cataract extraction technique.

== Modern use ==
Couching continues to be popular in some developing countries where modern surgery may be difficult to access or where the population may prefer to rely on traditional treatments. It is commonly practiced in Sub-Saharan Africa. In Mali it remains more popular than modern cataract surgery, despite the fact that the cost of both methods is similar, but with much poorer outcome with couching. In Burkina Faso, a majority of patients were unaware of the causes of cataracts and believed it to be due to fate. It is not performed by ophthalmologists, but rather by local healers or "witch doctors".

== Technique ==
A sharp instrument, such as a thorn or needle, is used to pierce the eye either at the edge of the cornea or the sclera, near the limbus. The opaque lens is pushed downwards, allowing light to enter the eye. Once the patient sees shapes or movement, the procedure is stopped. The patient is left without a lens (aphakic), therefore requiring a powerful positive prescription lens to compensate.

== Results ==
Couching is a largely unsuccessful technique with abysmal outcomes. A minority of patients may regain low or moderate visual acuity, but over 70% are left clinically blind with worse than 20/400 vision. A Nigerian study showed other complications include secondary glaucoma, hyphaema, and optic atrophy. Couching does not compare favourably to modern cataract surgery.
