= Ophthalmic pathology =

Medical specialty

Ophthalmic pathology is a subspecialty of both ophthalmology and surgical pathology concerned with the diagnosis and characterization of diseases of the eye and its associated structures, including neoplastic and non-neoplastic conditions of the human eyes. Ophthalmic pathologists work closely with ophthalmologists in the examination of ocular tissues and the clinicopathological correlation of eye disease.
