= Black chicken =

Black chicken usually refers to a chicken with solid black plumage.

Black chicken may also refer to:

- Ancona chicken, a breed that originated in Italy
- Ayam Cemani, a breed that originated in Central Java, Indonesia
- Jersey Giant, an American breed created by John and Thomas Black
- Kadaknath, a breed that originated in India
- Ogye, a breed that originated in South Korea
- Silkie (chicken breed), a breed that originated in China
- Svarthöna or Swedish Black Chicken
- White-Crested Black Polish, a type of Polish chicken

== See also ==
- "Black Chicken 37", a song by Buena Vista Social Club from the album Lost and Found
- Crow Black Chicken, an Irish blues-rock band
