= Little Bear (film) =

- Official promotional poster
- Directed by: Ger Duffy, Daire Glynn
- Written by: Daire Glynn
- Produced by: Felipa Robertson
- Starring: Kieran O'Reilly; Kojii Helnwein; Calum Heath
- Release date: 1 October 2015 (Vancouver International Film Festival)
- Running time: 12 minutes
- Country: Ireland
- Language: English

Little Bear is a short drama film written by Daire Glynn and directed by both Daire Glynn and Ger Duffy. The film was produced by Felipa Robertson with U2's the Edge featuring as one of the film's Executive Producers. Ivor Noyek designed the artwork for one of the film's promotional posters. The score for the film was written by Irish multi-instrumentalist, Ruairi Lynch (a.k.a. Bantum)

== Narrative ==
A short story of friendship, love and imagination.

== Cast ==
- Kieran O'Reilly - Man
- Kojii Helnwein - Woman
- Calum Heath - Boy

== Critical reception ==
The film had its world premiere at the Vancouver International Film Festival in October 2015 where it was only one of two Irish short films to be screened. Little Bear won the Audience Award at the Dublin International Film Festival 2016. Little Bear also won Best Original Score at the Top Shorts Online Film Festival in addition to three 'Honorable Mentions' for Director, Drama and Child Actor.

== Awards and nominations ==
Awards and nominations for Little Bear
Year	Association	Country	Award category	Status
2016	Dublin International Film Festival	Ireland	Audience Award for Short Films	Won
2016	Top Shorts Online Film Festival	United States	Best Original Score	Won
