= Svarthöna =

Breed of chicken

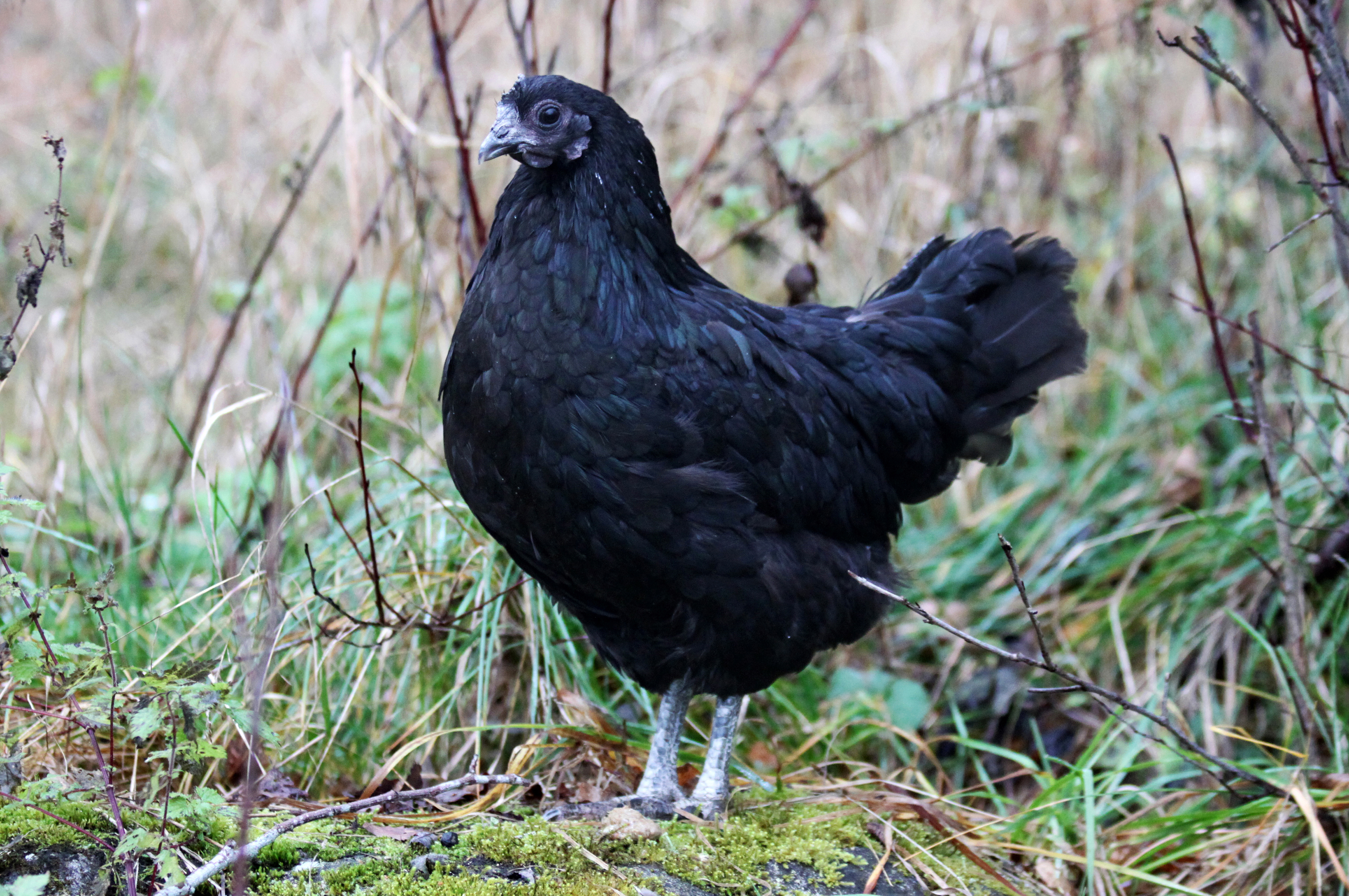
Svarthöna, hen

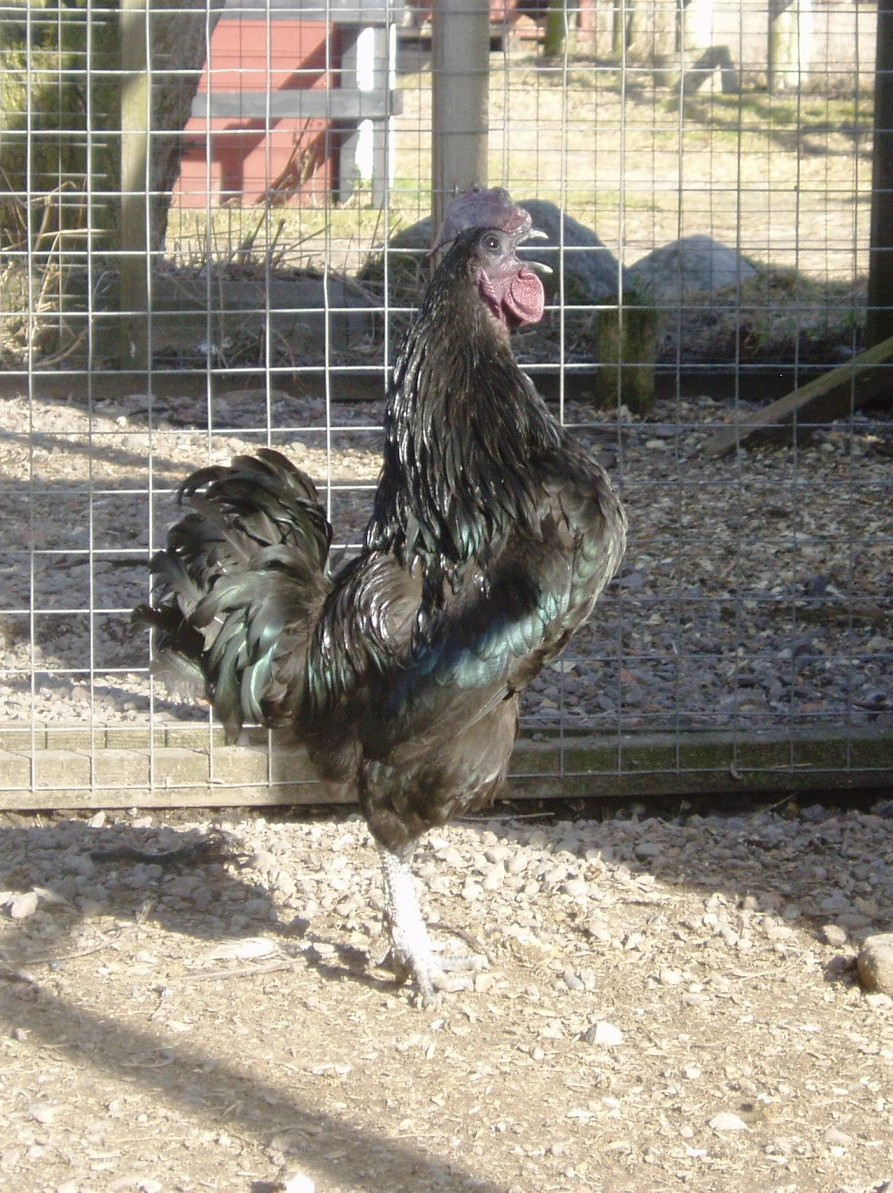
Svarthöna, rooster

Svarthöna, Bohuslän-Dals svarthöna, or Swedish Black Chicken is a Swedish landrace of domestic chickens that is considered to have originated from Ayam Cemani/Kadaknath breeds of chickens transported from Mozambique to Norway by sailors sometime in the 17th century. The Svarthöna has since adapted to a northerly climate, it but has retained the rare quality of black skin and connective tissue.

The current form of Svarthöna has been given the status of a landrace. All Swedish entries in gene banks can be traced to a group of chickens that came to Sweden around the turn of the 19th century. In 1956, this flock was bought by two brothers in Bullarebygd. The Swedish Association for Landrace Breeds has preserved the Svarthöna in a gene bank since 1991.

A rooster can weigh up to 2 kg, whilst hens do not exceed 1.5 kg. The eggs are small (38-48 g) with a large yolk. The Svarthöna has some flight ability.

The black pigmentation found in skin and connective tissue has been shown to be caused by a variant of the gene EDN3, a trait shared with the Chinese Silkie, Indonesian Ayam Cemani, and Vietnamese Black H'Mong.
