= Kieran O'Reilly =

Kieran O'Reilly may refer to:

- Kieran O'Reilly (bishop) (born 1952), bishop of Killaloe
- Kieran O'Reilly (performer) (born 1979), musician and actor
