= Farah Elle =

Irish singer

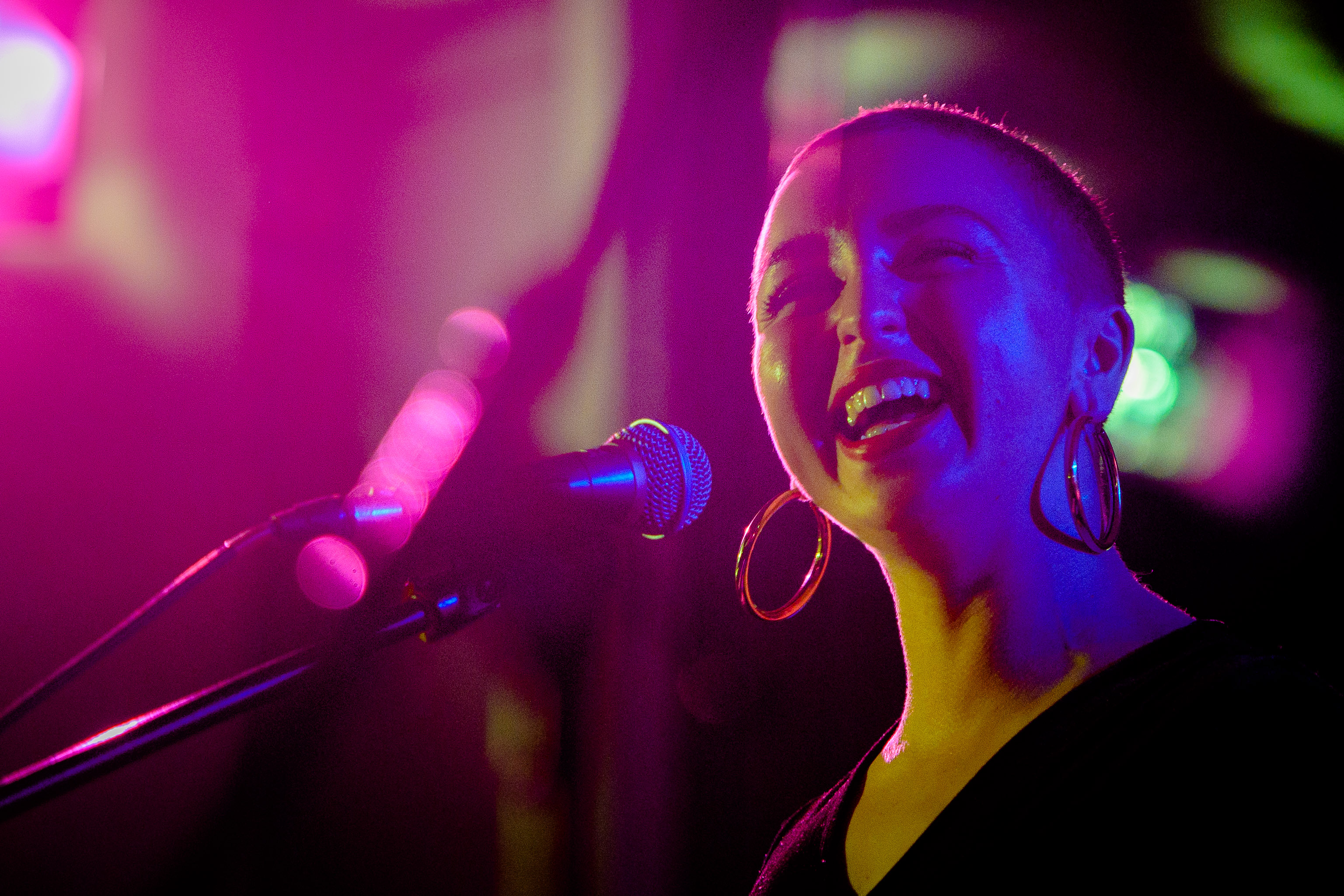

Background information
- Born: Farah El Neihum
- Origin: Libya
- Genres: R&B; Hip hop
- Years active: 2016–present
- Website: Farah Elle on Facebook

Farah Elle (born Farah El Neihum; 1994) is a Libyan-born Irish singer-songwriter.

== Early life and education ==
Farah Elle was born in Libya in 1994, named Farah El Neihum. Her family moved to Julianstown, County Meath, Ireland, in 1996. Her mother is a consultant ophthalmologist and politician, Fatima Hamroush. Elle was raised Muslim, attending the mosque in Clonskeagh, and is fluent in Arabic. She taught herself to play the keyboard as a teenager.

She attended BIMM, Dublin, graduating in 2016.

== Career ==
Farah Elle played her first headline gig at Sin É, Dublin in 2016. She played at the 2016 KnockanStockan music festival. She collaborated with CunninLynguists on the single Oh Honey and with Bantum on Feel It Out. She performed with at the 2019 Mother Tongues festival at Rua Red.

In 2019, Farah Elle released a single, Play For Keeps, with MuRli, and collaborated with Bantum, Ben Bix and God Knows on the single Strongest Thing. She was one of the artists who performed as part of the Conservatory Sessions run by Pine The Pilcrow in 2019.

For the 2020 Nollaig na mBan celebrations in EPIC the Irish Emigration Museum, Elle performed alongside Tara Flynn and Chiamaka Enyi-Amadi.

Her debut album, Fatima, was released in 2022.

== Other activities ==
Elle has volunteered at the direct provision centre in Mosney, County Louth.

== Discography ==
- Silk single (2015)
- Oh Honey single (2017) collaboration with CunninLynguists
- Feel It Out single (2017) collaboration with Bantum
- Play For Keeps single (2019) collaboration with MuRli
- Strongest Thing single and video (2019) collaboration with Bantum, Ben Bix and God Knows
- FATIMA (2020)
