= Helnwein =

Helnwein is a surname. Notable people with the surname include:

- Gottfried Helnwein (born 1948), Austrian-Irish artist
- Mercedes Helnwein (born 1979), artist, writer, and filmmaker
- Kojii Helnwein (born 1981), Irish model, actress, and musician
