= Community ophthalmic physician =

Community ophthalmic physician (COP) is a type of public medical ophthalmology post in Ireland.

COPs are employed by the Health Service Executive. COPs see patients referred by general practitioners, public health practitioners, hospital consultants, and other healthcare professionals. COPs may work in a combination of large university teaching hospitals, smaller general hospitals, rural areas, and private practice.

== Background ==
The post of COP was created by the Department of Health in 1980 in response to a report which identified the need for community-based rather than hospital-based primary eye care. 21 posts were created nationally, excluding the Dublin area, which continued to operate a hospital-based system. The original plan aimed to provide 1 COP per 100,000 population. Minimum qualifications included a Diploma in Ophthalmology from the Royal College of Physicians of Ireland.

== Specialist training ==
Training in medical ophthalmology is overseen by the Irish College of Ophthalmologists. After internship, trainees must undertake a 3-year Basic Surgical Training in ophthalmology followed by 1.5 years of specialist medical ophthalmology training which includes medical retina, paediatric ophthalmology, and uveitis. The exit exam is the European Board of Ophthalmology Diploma (EBOD). At the end of the programme, graduates receive the Certificate of Completion of Medical Ophthalmic Specialist Training.

== Current role ==
As of 2011, there are 22 COP posts in Ireland. COPs see and treat a variety of ophthalmic conditions, including:

- diabetic eye disease
- glaucoma
- macular degeneration
- strabismus
- uveitis

COPs also perform screening programmes for amblyopia, strabismus, and vision.

== See also ==
- Eye care professional
- Ophthalmic medical practitioner
