= Chiamaka Enyi-Amadi =

Irish poet

- Born: Lagos, Nigeria

Chiamaka Enyi-Amadi is a Nigerian-Irish poet, writer, editor, and performer.

== Poetry ==
Enyi-Amadi's poetry has been published in Architecture Ireland, Poetry International, Poetry Ireland Review, The MASI Journal, RTÉ Poetry Programme, Smithereens Press, The Bohemyth, The Irish Times, and in the volume Art of the Glimpse: 100 Irish Short Stories (2020). She received the 2019 Poetry Ireland Access Cúirt Bursary. In 2018, she was a speaker at the Dublin Human Rights Festival alongside Clara Rose Thornton and Farah Elle. She performed as part of the 2019 International Women's Day with Poetry Ireland. She was among the invited performers at the 2019 Measuring Equality in the Arts Sector conference. The Irish Museum of Modern Art commissioned her to write three poems in response to the 2019 exhibition A Fiction Close to Reality.

In 2019, Enyi-Amadi co-edited a volume of poetry with Pat Boran, Writing Home: The New Irish Poets, which featured poems from poets who have emigrated to Ireland. She was one of the featured writers and performers for the 2020 Nollaig na mBan celebrations in Epic, the Irish Emigration Museum. She collaborated with poet and singer-songwriter, Christie Kandiwa, on the piece entitled SEE x SEA for the Mother Tongues Festival in February 2020.

== Personal life ==
Chiamaka Enyi-Amadi was born in Lagos, Nigeria, and moved to Galway, Ireland at age 10. She attended University College Dublin graduating with a BA in English and Philosophy. While at UCD she edited and contributed to Otwo magazine for The University Observer.
