= Ophthalmic medical practitioner =

Physician who specializes in eye conditions

An ophthalmic medical practitioner (OMP) is a doctor with specialist training in ophthalmology. In the UK, OMPs are employed to carry out medical eye examinations and prescribe glasses, contact lenses, eyepatches and other orthoptic treatments, and refer patients for further investigation or treatment where necessary. OMPs undertake NHS sight tests under the General Ophthalmic Services contract. To work as an OMP, a doctor must be on the Central List of the Ophthalmic Qualifications Committee at the Royal College of Ophthalmologists. This is a statutory register administered by the British Medical Association. There are over 400 OMPs in the UK, registered and regulated by the General Medical Council.

OMPs are often trainee ophthalmologists who work to supplement their income. Some also work in the Hospital Eye Service, as general practitioners, or in other health care settings.

== See also ==
- Community ophthalmic physician
- Eye care professional
