= Kieran O'Reilly (performer) =

Irish actor and musician

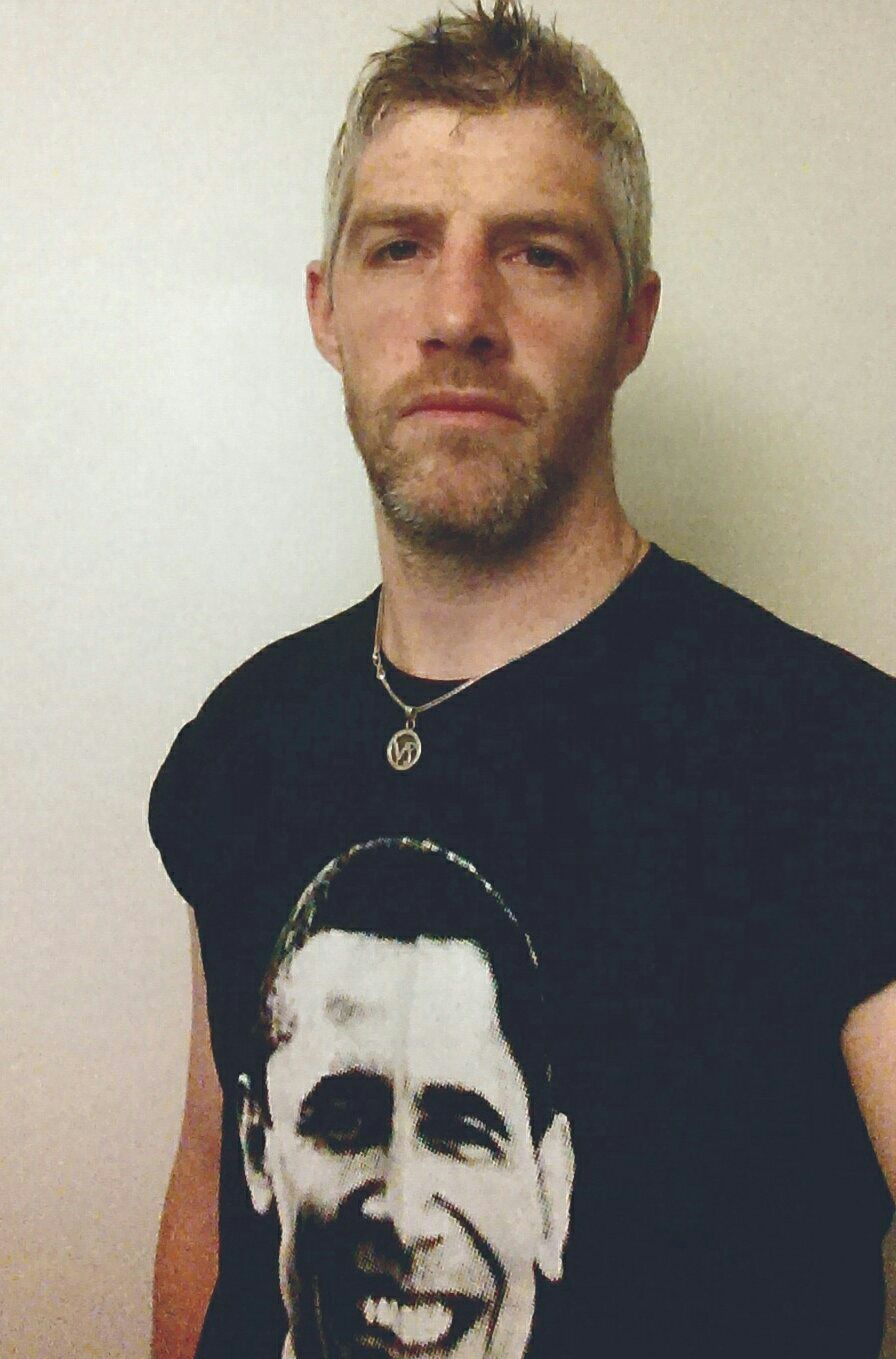
- O'Reilly in Dublin, Ireland in 2017

Background information
- Born: 3 September 1979 (age 47); Ireland
- Genres: Alternative, indie, rock
- Occupations: Musician, producer, actor, writer, police officer
- Instruments: Vocals, drums, guitar
- Years active: 2003–present
- Label: Independent

Kieran Mark O'Reilly (born 3 September 1979) is an Irish actor, musician and producer. He is also the songwriter and lead vocalist of the Irish alternative rock band, Hail The Ghost and his solo project, Kopium. He is known for his role as Detective Garda Ciarán Madden in RTÉ's crime drama Love/Hate and his role as 'White Hair' in the historical drama Vikings.

== Early life and career ==
O'Reilly was born Kieran Mark O'Reilly and is a twin. He grew up in Dublin and was educated at St. Kilians National School in Tallaght and Synge Street CBS in Dublin's City Centre. On leaving school, he worked as a clerk in the Special Detective Unit in Dublin and in 2000, he enrolled in the Garda Síochána (Ireland's National Police Force). He was stationed at Pearse Street Garda Station in the city centre where he worked in uniform and then in the District Drug Unit. He was then transferred to the National Drug Unit based in Dublin Castle, where he sometimes worked undercover.

== Law enforcement ==
O'Reilly was reported to have worked on more than 500 police investigations and was the lead investigating detective in the D.P.P. vs Sunny Idah case. Idah was convicted of conspiracy to import controlled drugs into Ireland from Brazil and was sentenced to 13 years in prison. O'Reilly also infiltrated 'Gangland Limerick' whilst living as a heroin addict, in one of the most high-profile long-term undercover drugs operations in An Garda Siochana's history. He was also involved in the seizure of €29 million worth of cocaine which resulted in lengthy prison sentences for Gareth Hopkins and Abraham Shodiya.

== Acting ==
In 2013, O'Reilly auditioned for a part in the RTÉ crime drama, Love/Hate, securing the role of Detective Ciarán Madden. He first appeared on Irish television screens on 12 October 2013 as part of the opening sequence to Episode 2 (Love/Hate Season 4) playing the part of an undercover cop posing as a drug addict ("Heggo"). This role caused some controversy amongst top ranking officers, in particular, the then Commissioner, Martin Callinan. He ordered an inquiry into O'Reilly's appearance in the show, despite the fact that O'Reilly had not infringed any regulations of the Police Code of Conduct. O'Reilly featured in Irish newspapers for several months and despite being transferred to The National Immigration Bureau, was cleared of all matters in 2014.

O'Reilly's acting debut was well received by the Irish public and he was credited as a natural talent. His Love/Hate co-star, Brían F. O'Byrne, praised O'Reilly's acting, stating, "He has a rare natural talent. As an actor, Kieran possesses an ease, a fluency and creativity on set that belies his novice status". He was also described by Love/Hate creator, Stuart Carolan, as "a pretty amazing actor". The Sunday Times journalist Liam Fay wrote that the show's "believability has been enhanced by a strikingly rough-edged performance from Kieran O'Reilly, a real-life undercover Garda". O'Reilly filmed Love/Hate Season 5 in 2014. As of 2015, he was a member of the Bow Street Academy for Screen Acting.

O'Reilly joined the cast of Vikings in 2017 playing the role of 'White Hair' across Seasons 5 and 6. O'Reilly's character met his demise in what has been described as the best one-on-one fight in the history of the show, when 'White Hair' took on lead actress Katheryn Winnick who played 'Lagertha', in what would be 'Lagertha's' last battle before being killed herself by 'Hvitserk'. The fight sequence was shot on location in Ireland over several days with both actors reportedly doing all the stunts themselves.

== Music ==
=== Doris ===
O'Reilly began playing music in 2003, teaching himself how to play the drums. That same year, he joined Dublin pop/rock band, Doris. O'Reilly was a central figure in the band's development and assisted in the releasing of the band's first two singles, "Will I Ever Learn" and "Stop". During O'Reilly's time in the band, they were selected by Hot Press Magazine to have a music video shot for "Will I Ever Learn" in conjunction with the Tisch School of the Arts, New York University. O'Reilly left the band in 2007.

=== White McKenzie ===
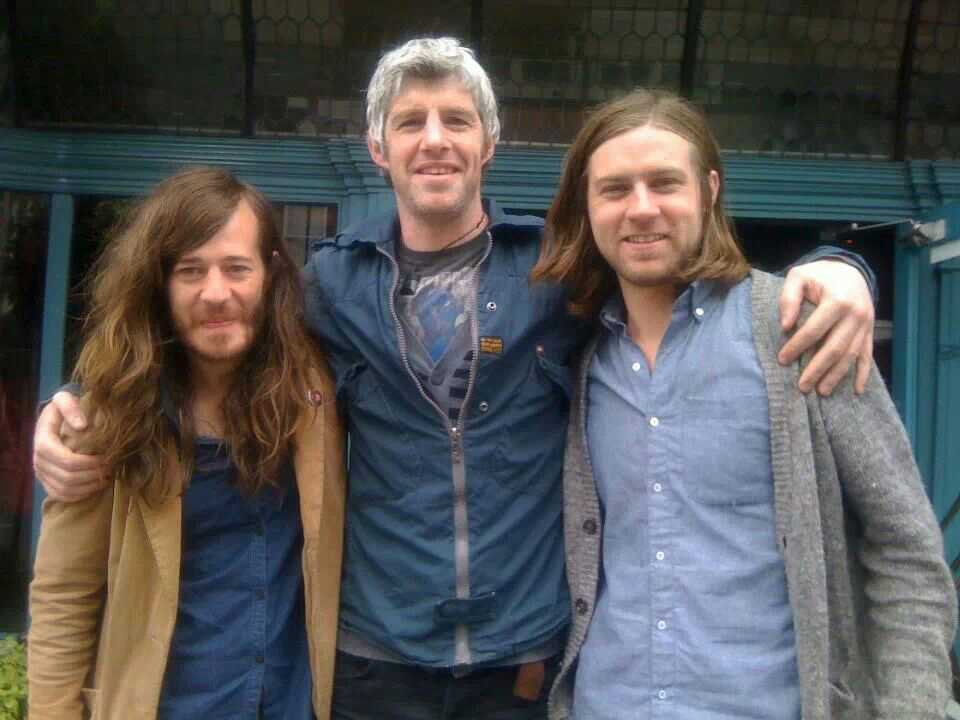
Kieran O'Reilly pictured in Dublin with members of the American Band, Other Lives.

O'Reilly formed White McKenzie in 2010 with a group of friends. He was the sole vocalist and songwriter for the band. In 2011, in only the band's third live performance, they played in the final of the Shercock Battle of the Bands competition, competing for a place to play in the Glastonbury Festival in the UK; however they missed out on the top prize to Irish blues band, Crow Black Chicken. O'Reilly and friends later released a 7 track Mini Album/E.P. entitled Absence. The sleeve image for this E.P. was provided by Rob Hann (New York City). In November 2011, Jackie Hayden of Hot Press Magazine chose Absence as his "Pick of the Fortnight". White McKenzie also opened the Kildare leg of the First Music Contact Tour on 9 November 2012, sharing the stage with Squarehead, We Cut Corners and The Lost Brothers. White McKenzie released their single, 'Heatseeker' in late 2012, shortly before the band broke up. Sensing band members were moving in different directions, O'Reilly decided to leave the band. "I just felt that I didn't really want to pursue it any longer, and I wanted to preserve the friendships that were there. Which we did, we're all still great friends. I just felt that we didn't know what we were doing, and I think the lads felt the same". The band were described by Today FM presenter, Ian Dempsey, as "really top quality". In 2016, several White McKenzie tracks were featured in the Irish film, "Coming Home" by Cathal Kenna.

=== Hail The Ghost ===
In 2014 O'Reilly formed Hail The Ghost which includes two former White McKenzie members, Ian Corr (piano/keys) and Eamon Young (guitars). O'Reilly spent 2014 writing and producing the band's debut album Forsaken with Corr, Young and Martin Quinn of JAM Studios who co-produced and engineered the album. The album features O'Reilly playing drums, guitar and vocals. He credits The National, The Antlers and Elbow as influences when he was composing the album's songs which would be: "a piece that would have that cohesive feel to it, we would have that thematic thing and we would also have a story, beginning to end. Though it's not necessarily a story [in a book] sense, but like an actual journey." The band's song, 'LAZISE' was used by the G.A.A. in their advertising campaign for the 'GAA NOW' initiative throughout the 2017 All-Ireland Championships. The online video was played 700,000 times in four weeks."

Hail The Ghost released their second studio album, 'Arrhythmia' on 6 December 2019 with The Irish Times referring to the album as a "smart collection of intelligent and sensitive rock... [that will] do the heart and soul good". Hot Press Magazine reported: "Last time round, we described them as "atmospheric indie", but 'Arrhythmia' is composed of bleaker soundscapes, more reminiscent of Joy Division".

=== Kieran O'Reilly & Ragga Ragnars ===
On 5 February 2020, O'Reilly released "Broken Wings" with his on-screen Vikings co-star and former double Olympian, Ragga Ragnars. The pair co-wrote the track before recording the song in JAM Studios in Ireland with Martin Quinn recording, mixing and mastering. The track was produced by O'Reilly and Martin Quinn. Hot Press Magazine described the song as "an absolute pearler". The music video for the track was filmed on location in Iceland by Ragnars' brother and filmmaker, Gudjon Ragnarsson.

=== Kopium ===
2025 saw the release of O'Reilly's first solo material under the moniker, 'Kopium'. His debut single, 'Sail' featured on RTÉ 2XM's 'The London Ear' as the recommended track of the week. Rotate Magazine wrote: "Sail" introduces listeners to this tonal shift with its delicate melodies and introspective lyrics. The track is steeped in melancholy, weaving O’Reilly's evocative vocals with a subtle instrumental backdrop that underscores the vulnerability of his storytelling. It's a mesmerizing start, promising a cohesive yet varied journey through, The Weeping Willow".

Kopium's debut album, 'The Weeping Willow' was released on 28 February 2025 on O'Reilly's White Heart Records. In reviewing the album for 'The Irish Post', Tony Clayton-Lea stated: "As implied by the album title, the mellow music hints towards the sombre and reflective; the song narratives, too, outline a rare poignancy that occasionally nods to the melancholy yields of Nick Cave and Richard Hawley, and the spooky spirit of Roy Orbison". Hotpress Magazine wrote on the release of the single 'No Thorns': "'No Thorns' is a mellow yet incredibly transporting ballad, both reflective and conversational in nature. With the musician’s buttery-smooth voice and the warmth of the song’s arrangements, 'No Thorns' makes for a poignant and terribly exciting new number from the Irish musician and actor."

== Writing ==
O'Reilly wrote the screenplay for the Irish feature film, 'For Molly', which premiered on 4 October 2018. He wrote the film in just four months and when asked about how he began writing, O'Reilly credited Love/Hate writer, Stuart Carolan with being the primary inspiration - stating, "I have been writing ever since I picked up Stuart Carolan’s script [for Love/Hate] because when I picked up that script, I thought: I want to be a writer." O'Reilly is reported to have written numerous screenplays since starting to write in 2013.

== Sport ==
O’Reilly was a member of the Sportsworld A.C. in Dublin. He competed in both track and cross-country. In 1999, at 19 years of age, O’Reilly finished 7th in the National Under 23 Irish Championships in the 400m, with future Olympians Paul Oppermann taking gold and James Nolan taking bronze.

O’Reilly joined Mount Tallant Boxing Club in 1996 where he was trained by former double Olympian Mick Dowling. In 1998 O’Reilly won the Dublin and Leinster Novice Middleweight Boxing Titles. In 1999 he won the Dublin and Leinster Intermediate Light-Heavyweight Boxing Titles, defeating Martin Sweeney of Phoenix Boxing Club in the Leinster final. In 2002, O’Reilly was defeated by Jamie Power of St. Francis Boxing Club in the quarter-finals of the National Irish Junior Championships. In 2003, O’Reilly won gold at the World Police and Fire Games in Barcelona in the Intermediate Light-Heavyweight division.

== Filmography ==
=== Film/Television ===
Year	Title	Role	Notes
2013–2014	Love/Hate	Heggo/Det. Ciaran Madden	TV drama – 11 episodes
2014	Hail The Ghost: Headstoned	Himself	(Music Video) Writer
2015	Little Bear	Man	Short film
2015	Battlefield Hardline	Gamer	Promo
2015	Bully	Mr Fallon	Film
2016	Prodigy	News Reporter	Short film
2016	Rebellion	Captain Robert Barton	TV drama - 3 episodes
2017–2020	Vikings	White Hair	TV drama - 10 episodes
2017	The Professor and the Madman	Minor's Father	Film
2018	For Molly	Evan Brady	Film (Writer)
2018	Her Name Is	Male Addict	Short Film
2020	Bloomsday Lock-In	Bloom	Film
2020	Broken Wings	Himself	(Music Video) Writer
2020	Poster Boys	Dermot	Film
2021	Save Me From Everything	Martin Von	Film
2021	Wanna Hang Out?	Brian	Short Film
2021	Dalgliesh	Henry Yates	TV show - 1 episode
2022	North Sea Connection	James	TV show - 1 episode
2023	Missing	Frankie	Short Film
2025	El Turco	Skeletwolf	TV Drama - 5 episodes

== Discography ==
=== Albums ===
Year	Album details
2011	White McKenzie – Absence: Released: 30 September 2011; Label: Independent; Formats: CD/Digital; Band: White McKenzie
2015	Hail The Ghost – Forsaken: Released: 6 March 2015; Label: Independent; Formats: CD/Digital; Band: Hail The Ghost
2019	Hail The Ghost – Arrhythmia: Released: 6 December 2019; Label: Independent; Formats: CD/Vinyl/Digital Download; Band: Hail The Ghost
2020	White McKenzie – Dust on the Attic Floor: Released: 11 May 2020; Label: White Heart Records; Formats: Digital Download; Band: White McKenzie
2022	Ears Have Walls – Ears Have Walls: Released: 30 September 2022; Label: Independent; Formats: Digital Download; Band: Ears Have Walls
2025	Kopium - The Weeping Willow: Released: 28 February 2025; Label: White Heart Records; Formats: Digital Download/Streaming; Band: Kopium

=== Singles ===
Year	Single	Band	Peak chart positions
Year	Single	Band	IRE
2006	"Will I Ever Learn"	Doris	22
2007	"Stop"	Doris	32
2012	"Heatseeker"	White McKenzie	–
2014	"Headstoned"	Hail The Ghost	1
2015	"Colony of Ants"	Hail The Ghost	16
2019	"Sweet Samurai"	Hail The Ghost	n/a
2020	"Broken Wings"	Kieran O'Reilly & Ragga Ragnars	n/a
2020	"Kalta"	Ears Have Walls	n/a
2020	"Ouden"	Ears Have Walls	n/a
2020	"Mercury Falls"	Hail the Ghost	n/a
2020	"Petrichor"	Ears Have Walls	n/a
2020	"Wishbone"	Hail the Ghost	n/a
2020	"Reflection"	Magellanic Cloud	n/a
2020	"Saint Jude"	Ears Have Walls	n/a
2020	"Up River"	Ears Have Walls	n/a
2023	"Bloodflow"	Eurelle & Hail The Ghost	n/a
2023	"Lovesong"	Hail The Ghost	n/a
2025	"Sail"	Kopium	n/a
2025	"Blue Child Gypsy Dancer"	Kopium	n/a
2025	"No Thorns"	Kopium	n/a

== Awards and nominations ==
Year	Work	Award	Result
2016	Little Bear	Discovery Award, Dublin International Film Festival	Nominated
2021	Save Me From Everything	Best Actor in Male Role, Richard Harris Film Festival	Nominated
2022	Save Me From Everything	Best Actor, Massachusetts Indie Film Festival	Nominated
