= Arrhythmia (Hail the Ghost album) =

- Album cover for Arrhythmia

Studio album by Hail the Ghost
- Released: 6 December 2019
- Recorded: Jam Studios, Ireland
- Genre: Indie rock, art rock
- Length: 38:09
- Label: White Heart Records
- Producer: Kieran O'Reilly/Martin Quinn

Hail the Ghost chronology
Forsaken (2015)	Arrhythmia (2019)

Singles from Arrhythmia
- 1. "Sweet Sumarai" Released: 29 October 2019

Professional ratings
Review scores
Source	Rating
Hot Press	(7.5/10)
The Irish Times	3/5 stars

Arrhythmia is the second studio album from Irish art rock band, Hail the Ghost, which was released on 6 December 2019 on CD, vinyl and digital formats.

== Recording ==
The album was recorded, mixed and mastered in JAM Studios, Kells, County Meath in Ireland between 2016 and 2019. The album was produced by Kieran O'Reilly and Martin Quinn.

== Album artwork ==
The album sleeve for Arrhythmia is the work of Italian visual artist, Sveva Robiony.

== Album release ==
=== Critical reception ===
The album received favourable reviews with The Irish Times referring to the album as a "smart collection of intelligent and sensitive rock...[that will] do the heart and soul good." Hot Press Magazine reported: "Last time round, we described them as "atmospheric indie", but 'Arrhythmia' is composed of bleaker soundscapes, more reminiscent of Joy Division". Kelly Crisp of The Rosebuds said of the album: "this album [Arrhythmia] is luxurious, and a reminder that we're here now, making art and loving beautiful music".

== Personnel ==
Hail the Ghost

- Kieran O'Reilly – Vocals, Backing Vocals, Drums, Guitar, Percussion
- Eamonn Young – Guitars
- Ian Corr – Piano/Keyboards

Additional contributors

- Martin Quinn - Bass Guitar, Keyboards, Piano, Percussion
- Paul Higgins - Guitars, Tracks 4,7,8
- Eamonn Young Sr. - Saxophone, Track 10
- Joe Donnelly - Spoken Word, Track 1
- Zach Minogue O'Reilly - Boys Laughing, Track 11
- Lua Minogue O'Reilly - Boys Laughing, Track 11

Technical Personnel

- Producer – Kieran O'Reilly & Martin Quinn
- Engineer/Mixer – Martin Quinn
- Mastering – Martin Quinn

Live musicians

- Kieran O'Reilly – Vocals & Guitar
- Eamonn Young – Guitars
- Ian Corr – Piano/Keys
- Martin Quinn – Bass & Backing Vocals
- Paul Higgins – Guitars
- Gavin Mulhall – Drums

== Track listing ==
All lyrics are written by Kieran O'Reilly (except where noted)

No.	Title	Length
1.	"Prologue - (Joe Donnelly)"	0:46
2.	"Swarms"	4:25
3.	"Gwendolen"	3:51
4.	"Pirouette"	3:49
5.	"Sweetest Dream"	4:08
6.	"Mountain"	2:41
7.	"Black Karma"	3:45
8.	"Sweet Samurai"	3:23
9.	"Loveless"	3:27
10.	"Elegy"	3:13
11.	"Home"	4:41
Total length:		38:09
