= Fatima Hamroush =

Libyan ophthalmologist and politician (born 1959)

Fatima Hamroush فاطمة الحمروش
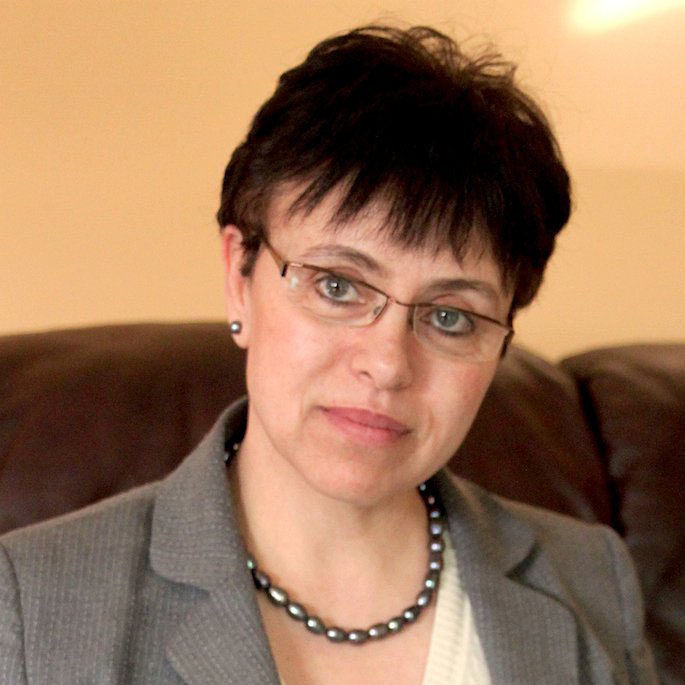

Health Minister
- In office 22 November 2011 – November 2012
- Prime Minister: Abdurrahim El-Keib
- Preceded by: Mohammed Hijazi
- Succeeded by: Noureddine Daghman

Personal details
- Born: 14 February 1959 (age 67) Benghazi, Libya
- Party: Independent
- Profession: Ophthalmologist

Fatima Hamroush (Arabic: فاطمة الحمروش; born 14 February 1959) is an ophthalmologist and Libyan politician.

== Personal life ==
Born in Benghazi on 14 February 1959, Hamroush moved to Ireland in 1996 and later became an Irish citizen through naturalisation and thereby became a dual Irish-Libyan citizen. She lived in Julianstown, County Meath, Ireland. She has four children, one of whom is the singer-songwriter, Farah Elle.

== Medical career ==
In February 1983, Hamroush graduated with a medical degree (MB BS) from Garyounis University and in December 1999 became a Fellow of the Royal College of Surgeons of Edinburgh. Hamroush is a member of the Irish College of Ophthalmologists, specialising in glaucoma, medical retina, and neuro-ophthalmology. From 2000, until the 2011 Libyan civil war, Hamroush held the position of consultant ophthalmologist at Our Lady of Lourdes Hospital, Drogheda, Ireland.

From November 2011 to November 2012, Dr Hamroush held the position of the Minister of Health in the Libyan Transitional Government. During her term, Hamroush showed a remarkable intolerance to corruption and, despite the difficult circumstances, was successful in developing the foundations for Libya's national medical services. She returned to Ireland in November, after handing over to the new Minister of Health, Dr Noureddine Doghman.

In January 2013, she resumed her public consultant ophthalmologist post in OLLH and her private practice in Drogheda.

== Political career ==
On 22 November 2011, Hamroush was announced as Libya's first female Health Minister by Prime Minister of Libya Abdurrahim El-Keib. Hamroush is also director of Irish Libyan Emergency Aid. Dr Hamroush is the daughter of Abdullah Hamroush, former colonel and court-martial judge during the kingdom, before the coup in 1969. Her father was jailed on the night of the coup in an act of revenge for imprisoning Gaddafi in 1967 after being charged with torturing a soldier during a training session. Her father was kept in jail for four years before a court hearing declared him innocent.

Dr Hamroush opposed the Gaddafi regime and became a well-known and active member of the Libyan opposition from 2008, where she collaborated with many members of the Libyan opposition abroad and inside Libya. However, for security reasons, she used the synonym "Alleebeya" الليبية when she published many articles in opposition websites, shared in raising public, local and international awareness of the dictatorial regime and became the co-editor of the opposition website "Libya Almostaqbal" from 2009 to January 2011. She also assisted in funding demonstrations worldwide in support of the Libyan people's struggle against the Gaddafi regime.

Her identity was revealed at the onset of 17 February 2011 revolution, when she raised the Libyan tricolour flag in front of the GPO in Dublin's city centre. She was witnessed as the first person to raise the flag in the Republic of Ireland.

On 26 February 2011, she and her son, Abdullah Elneihum (Abe Neihum), founded the Irish Libyan Emergency Aid (ILEA), a humanitarian aid organisation to provide medical supplies to Libya during the revolution, which assisted in providing medical equipment and consumables during the revolution to almost all areas in Libya. In September 2011, upon the request of the executive office of the National Transitional Council, Dr Hamroush formed the Libyan Health Office Of Ireland to assist in the treatment of the war wounded and difficult medical cases whose treatment was unavailable in Libya. She was also quoted that the office was formed to assist in recruiting medical specialists to Libya and improve medical training with the aim of nationalising treatment.

In November 2011, Dr Hamroush was named as the Minister of Health for Libya in the Transitional Government, made up of 24 ministers, two of whom were women, a Prime Minister and three deputies. Dr Hamroush held office from 2 December 2011 until early November 2012.

From March 2012 to August, Dr Hamroush became involved in a controversy when blocking major corruption within the war wounded treatment program, which was directed by a separate department outside of the Ministry of Health. By August 2012, she blocked the War Wounded Committee from continuing its unorthodox practise and merged the treatment of the war wounded into the health department and issued decrees for criminal and forensic accounting procedures.

During her short term, Dr Hamroush put in motion many projects in her Ministry that were stalled during the war. At the end of her term, she presented an account of her term to the General National Council and the Temporary Government, as well as the General Prosecutor, highlighting the need to control security and corruption along with raising the standards of work ethics and administrative skills among the Libyan population in order to achieve reform.

At the end of 2013, after her return to Ireland, Hamroush began to develop a programme for dialogue and reconciliation by organising conferences and networking for Libyan officials and former officials of the previous regime, an incentive named The National Libyan Dialogue for Reconciliation.

The programme for Dialogue achieved a degree of success in encouraging the diaspora, namely groups affiliated with and formerly of the previous regime, to voice their concerns and to come forward to develop the State. The power struggle that soon followed in mid-2014, mainly the civil war that erupted between the East and West of Libya, has discouraged Hamroush from any direct political involvement, limiting herself to only voicing her impartial opinion in interviews.

She now resides in Ireland, returning to her post as Consultant Medical Ophthalmologist.
