= Irish College of Ophthalmologists =

- Motto: "Eye doctors of Ireland, protecting your vision"
- Type: Private
- Established: 1991
- Affiliations: RCSI
- Students: 195
- Location: 121 St. Stephen's Green, Dublin, Ireland
- Campus: Urban
- Dean President CEO: Yvonne Delaney; Alison Blake; Siobhán Kelly
- Website: http://www.eyedoctors.ie

The Irish College of Ophthalmologists or ICO is the recognised body for ophthalmology training in Ireland. Founded in 1991, it represents over 200 ophthalmologists in Ireland. Its current president is Dr Patricia Quinlan. Yvonne Delaney serves as Dean.

== Governance ==
The ICO is overseen by its Council which is elected every 3 years by College members. The College also appoints a Clinical Lead for National Clinical Programme in Ophthalmology, a Dean of Postgraduate Education, and a Programme Director for Surgical Training. The business of the College is assisted by: a Manpower, Education and Training Committee; a Medical Ophthalmology Committee; an Ethics Committee; and a Scientific and Continuing Professional Development Committee.

== Education ==
The ICO oversees postgraduate medical and surgical ophthalmology training in Ireland. The ICO is a recognised training body of the Medical Council of Ireland. Its remit includes approval of hospital training posts. As part of its international activities, the College is twinned with the New England Ophthalmological Society. In 2011, the ICO introduced an online Professional Competency Scheme, to comply with new legislation and Irish Medical Council regulations. The ICO also collaborates with the Health Service Executive and engages in outreach and education for patients and the general public.

== Training scheme ==
The ICO supervise and co-ordinate the two strands of the ophthalmology training programme in Ireland: Basic Surgical Training (BST) and Higher Surgical Training (HST). Completion of a pre-registration intern year is required before applying for ophthalmology training.

=== Basic Surgical Training ===
The BST programme involves rotating through various sub-specialities. Trainees work as Senior House Officers over a minimum of three years at hospital sites in one of three combinations:

- 1. South Dublin Scheme: Royal Victoria Eye and Ear Hospital (RVEEH) and Sligo University Hospital
- 2. North Dublin Scheme: Mater Misericordiae University Hospital, University Hospital Galway, and University Hospital Waterford
- 3. Munster Scheme: Mid-Western Regional Hospital, Limerick and Cork University Hospital

Formal training includes use of surgical simulators, continuous assessment and a mandatory human factors course. During the BST, trainees sit examinations at RVEEH to gain Membership of the Royal College of Surgeons in Ireland, the MRCSI (Ophth) qualification. At the end of the BST, successful trainees receive the Certificate of Completion of Basic Surgical Training (CCBST), with which they may apply for the competitive HST programme.

=== Higher Surgical Training ===
The HST scheme is a pre-requisite for obtaining a post as a hospital consultant. HST lasts four-and-a-half years and covers seven core sub-specialities:

- oculoplastic, adnexal, and lacrimal surgery
- cornea and external diseases
- cataract and refractive surgery
- glaucoma
- retina, vitreous, uvea, and ocular oncology
- neuro-ophthalmology
- paediatric ophthalmology and strabismus

Trainees are assessed every 6 months and in their final year must complete a fellowship exam, the FRCSI (Ophth). This exit exam comprises a one-hour viva voce and a written test. Successful candidates also receive the Certificate of Completion of Specialist Training (CCST).

== Research ==
The ICO holds an annual conference where members and guests present research abstract, talks and posters. From 2000 to 2011, the annual ICO/Pfizer Research Fellowship was presented at the conference. The award sponsored trainee doctors to undertake research in ophthalmology. From 2013, the ICO partnered with Novartis to sponsor the ICO/Novartis Research Award. In 2017, the ICO introduced a Clinical Fellowship Bursary, in conjunction with Bayer.

=== Recipients of the ICO/Bayer Clinical Fellowship Bursary ===
- 2017 – Caroline Baily

=== Recipients of the ICO/Novartis Research Award ===
- 2016 – Sinéad Connolly and Reinold Goetz (ex aequo)
- 2015 – Ghaleb Farouki and Khalid Kamel (ex aequo)
- 2014 – Maedbh Rhatigan,
- 2013 – Micheal O'Rourke

=== Recipients of the ICO/Pfizer Research Fellowship ===
- 2011 – Conor Malone
- 2010 – Fergus Doyle and We Fong Siah (ex aequo)
- 2009 – Catherine Cleary
- 2008 – Kevin Kennelly
- 2007 – Jeremy O'Connor
- 2006 – unknown
- 2005 – Noel Horgan
- 2004 – Tom Flynn
- 2003 – unknown
- 2002 – unknown
- 2001 – unknown
- 2000 – unknown

== Notable members ==
- Fatima Hamroush, Libya's first female Health Minister
