= Forsaken (album) =

- Album cover for Forsaken

Studio album by Hail the Ghost
- Released: March 6, 2015
- Recorded: Jam Studios, Ireland
- Genre: Indie rock, art rock
- Length: 41:27
- Label: Independent
- Producer: Kieran O'Reilly/Martin Quinn

Hail the Ghost chronology
Forsaken (2015)	Arrhythmia (2019)

Singles from Forsaken
- 1. "Headstoned" Released: December 5, 2014; 2. "Colony of Ants" Released: February 6, 2015

Professional ratings
Review scores
Source	Rating
Hot Press	(7.5/10)
Irish Independent	4/5 stars
Scene Point Blank	(8/10).

Forsaken is the debut album from the Irish three piece indie/ art rock band, Hail the Ghost, which was released independently on March 6, 2015, on CD and Digital formats. The music on the album was described as "ambient, cinematic alternative rock" by lead singer and songwriter, Kieran O'Reilly.

== Recording ==
The album was recorded, mixed and mastered in JAM Studios, Kells, County Meath in Ireland between January 2014 and January 2015. The album was Produced by Kieran O'Reilly and Martin Quinn.

== Album artwork ==
The artwork for the album was a photograph taken by O'Reilly's on-screen Love/Hate co-star, Brían F. O'Byrne, who took the photograph of his youngest daughter, Oona, while at home in Cavan. The image is entitled "Oona hears a noise".

== Album release ==
=== Critical reception ===
The album received favourable reviews; Tony Clayton-Lea (The Irish Times) wrote a review on the album for HMV stating, "Hail The Ghost comes across not so much a side or vanity project as a bona fide artistic statement." The album was acknowledged well critically with Hotpress Magazine stating, "The playing throughout is impeccable, and the production pristine, with every instrument allowed to breathe naturally. The overall effect is one of gorgeous contemplative calm. Excellent." The Irish Independent's review of the album included, "Forsaken is unambiguously from the heart" and the "unremitting bleakness is curiously endearing." Dublin Concerts described the album as an "Impossibly beautiful album". The Sunday Times referred to Hail the Ghost as "A winningly downbeat ensemble." Hail the Ghost also performed at Ireland's Electric Picnic Festival 2015

=== Charts ===
Forsaken reached number 2 in the Irish Alternative iTunes Chart in its first week and following an appearance on The Saturday Night Show, the album re-entered the Alternative Irish Charts at number 7 and climbed to number 3 in the Irish Alternative iTunes Chart. Forsaken peaked at number 67 in the Irish National Music Charts

== Personnel ==
Hail the Ghost

- Kieran O'Reilly – Vocals, Backing Vocals, Drums & Guitar
- Eamonn Young – Guitars
- Ian Corr – Piano/Keyboards

Additional contributors

- Martin Quinn - Bass Guitar, Electric/Acoustic Guitars and Keyboards
- Joe Harney (Deaf Joe) – Backing Vocals on 'Headstoned' and 'Drift'

Technical Personnel

- Producer – Kieran O'Reilly & Martin Quinn
- Engineer/Mixer – Martin Quinn
- Mastering – Martin Quinn

Live musicians

- Kieran O'Reilly – Vocals & Guitar
- Eamonn Young – Guitar
- Ian Corr – Keyboards
- Martin Quinn – Bass & Backing Vocals
- Paul Higgins – Guitars
- Gavin Mulhall – Drums

== Track listing ==
All lyrics are written by Kieran O'Reilly.

No.	Title	Length
1.	"Nostalgia"	4:24
2.	"Colony of Ants"	3:46
3.	"Ink & Blood"	3:39
4.	"Gabriel"	3:52
5.	"Headstoned"	3:04
6.	"Even Judas"	6:03
7.	"Lazise"	3:38
8.	"Low Lying Fog"	3:40
9.	"White Heart"	4:56
10.	"Drift"	4:25
Total length:		41:27
