= Hail the Ghost =

Irish band

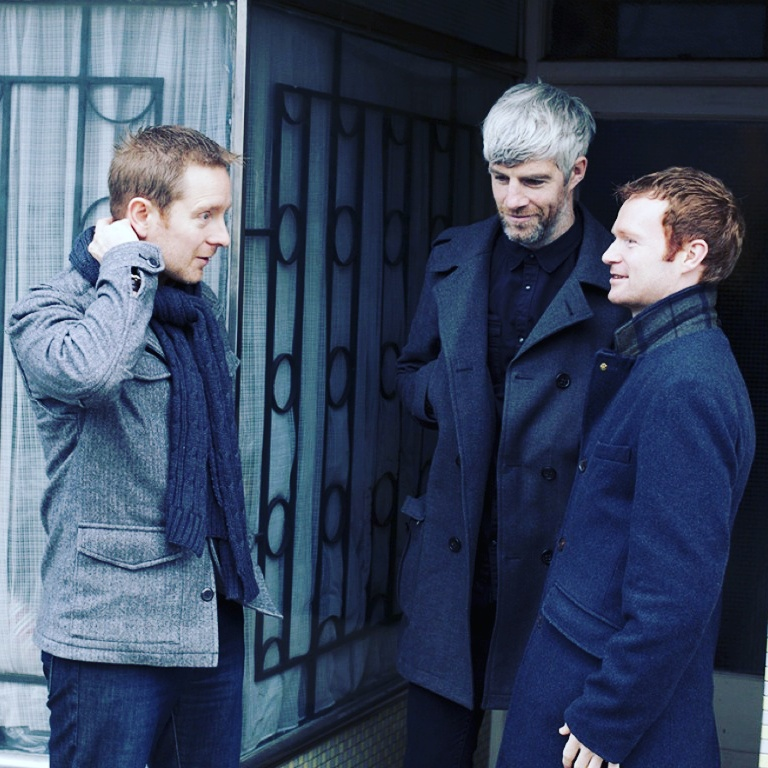
- Hail the Ghost in Dublin, Ireland in 2016

Background information
- Origin: Dublin, Ireland
- Genres: Indie rock, art rock
- Years active: 2014–present
- Labels: Independent label
- Members: Kieran O'Reilly; Eamonn Young; Ian Corr
- Website: www.hailtheghost.com

Hail the Ghost are a three-piece indie band from Ireland. The band was formed in January 2014 by actor/singer/songwriter Kieran O'Reilly. The band includes two former members of White McKenzie - Eamonn Young and Ian Corr. White McKenzie were a six-piece rock band which had also been formed by Kieran O'Reilly but which broke up in late 2012.

== Genre ==
Hot Press magazine described Hail the Ghost's sound as "mean 'n' moody" and in one review wrote that they [Hail the Ghost] "Come across as the kind of band Talk Talk might have sounded like if they were fronted by the Bunnymen's Ian McCullough". O'Reilly himself described the band's music as "cinematic, atmospheric, alternative rock" during an interview with Brendan O'Connor on The Saturday Night Show following the release of the band's debut album. "The band’s style of music has alternative written all over it, but what could be the rule breaker is the detachment from your typical indie stereotype of late and instead delving back into the heydays of Interpol and The Editors, with that little bit of added Irish charm of course!" as published by Pure M Magazine. Tony Clayton-Lea (The Irish Times) wrote on the band's debut album release for HMV.com and sited "The National and Interpol" as obvious influences but remarked that the songs were "well constructed". On the band's official website, they are described as "a prevalent brooding ambience intertwined with elegant piano, baritone vocals and a luring understated alt-rock quality". A review of the band's first-ever live performance by Hot Press magazine penned how O'Reilly "makes for an interesting frontman, with his shoulders often hunched and eyes downcast, clutching the mic and cord with two hands while bobbing and swaying to the beat in a manner similar to Leonard Cohen, fully absorbed in the music. His baritone voice lands somewhere between the aforementioned and Lou Reed in its everyman cool, casual delivery and sounded right at home among the dreamy textures".

== Band members ==
- Kieran O'Reilly - vocals, drums, guitar
- Eamonn Young - guitars
- Ian Corr - piano, keyboards

Additional for live performances

- Martin Quinn
- Paul Higgins
- Gavin Mulhall

== Appearances in media ==
- Redwater (BBC - TV Drama) - "Lazise"
- Six Nations Rugby Final (Advert) - "Lazise"
- G.A.A. NOW Campaign (Advert) - "Lazise"
- The Letter (Short Film) - "Headstoned"
- The Letter (Short Film) - "Even Judas"

== Discography ==
Studio albums

Year	Album details	Peak chart positions
Year	Album details	IRL
2015	Forsaken: Released: 6 March 2015; Label: Self Released; Formats: CD, Download	67
2019	Arrhythmia: Released: 6 December 2019; Label: White Heart Records; Formats: CD, Vinyl, Download	—
"—" denotes a title that did not chart.

Singles

- Headstoned (2014)
- Colony of Ants (2015)
- Sweet Samurai (2019)
- Mercury Falls (2020)
- Wishbone (2020)
- Bloodflow (2023)

== Music videos ==
- "Headstoned" on YouTube (2014) - directed by Apple Drop and Kieran O'Reilly.
- "Sweet Samurai" on YouTube (2019) - directed by Kieran O'Reilly.
