= European Board of Ophthalmology =

Professional ophthalmology board

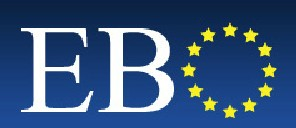
EBO

The European Board of Ophthalmology (EBO) is the European professional association for ophthalmology.

Founded in London in 1992, it is a permanent working group of the European Union of Medical Specialists (UEMS). EBO aims to harmonise standards and improve the quality of ophthalmology training across Europe.

== Examinations ==
EBO awards the title Fellow of the European Board of Ophthalmology (FEBO) upon success in a high-stakes, standardised clinical examination. The EBO diploma exam replaces the national certification examination in France, Switzerland, Belgium, Poland, Republic of Ireland, Austria, Croatia and Slovenia.
In addition to the EBO diploma exam, the EBO runs subspeciality exams in partnership with European ophthalmological societies:
FEBOS-SP (paediatric ophthalmology and strabismus) in partnership with the European Paediatric Ophthalmological Society (EPOS) and the European Strabismological Association (ESA)
FEBOS-R (retina) in partnership with the European Society of Retina Specialists (EURETINA)
FEBOS-OPRS (oculoplastics) in partnership with the European Society of Ophthalmic Plastics and Reconstructive Surgery (ESOPRS)
FEBOS-CR (cataract and refractive) in partnership with the European Society of Cataract and Refractive Surgeons (ESCRS)
FEBOS-GL (glaucoma) in partnership with the European Glaucoma Society (EGS)
