= Bantum =

- Born: Ruairí Lynch; 5 October 1983 (age 42); Cork, Ireland
- Origin: Cork
- Genres: electronic; dance; funk
- Occupations: Musician, composer
- Years active: 2008–present
- Label: Eleven Eleven
- Website: bantumsound.com

Ruairí Lynch (born 5 October 1983), known by the stage name Bantum, is an Irish multi-instrumentalist, musician, DJ, producer and composer.

== Early life ==
Lynch grew up in Cork. He has no formal music training, having studied Business Information Systems in University College Cork. The Chemical Brothers were an early inspiration.

== Career ==
Lynch began making music in Dublin in 2010. The name "Bantum" originated as a mishearing of the wrestling term "bantamweight." He composed music for the short Little Bear (2015). Bantum released the album Move in 2016, which was nominated for the prestigious Choice Music Prize. He was also nominated by The Irish Times for Irish Artist Of The Year in that year.

== Discography ==
Studio albums

- Legion (2012)
- Move (2016)
