= Ayam Cemani =

Breed of chicken from Indonesia

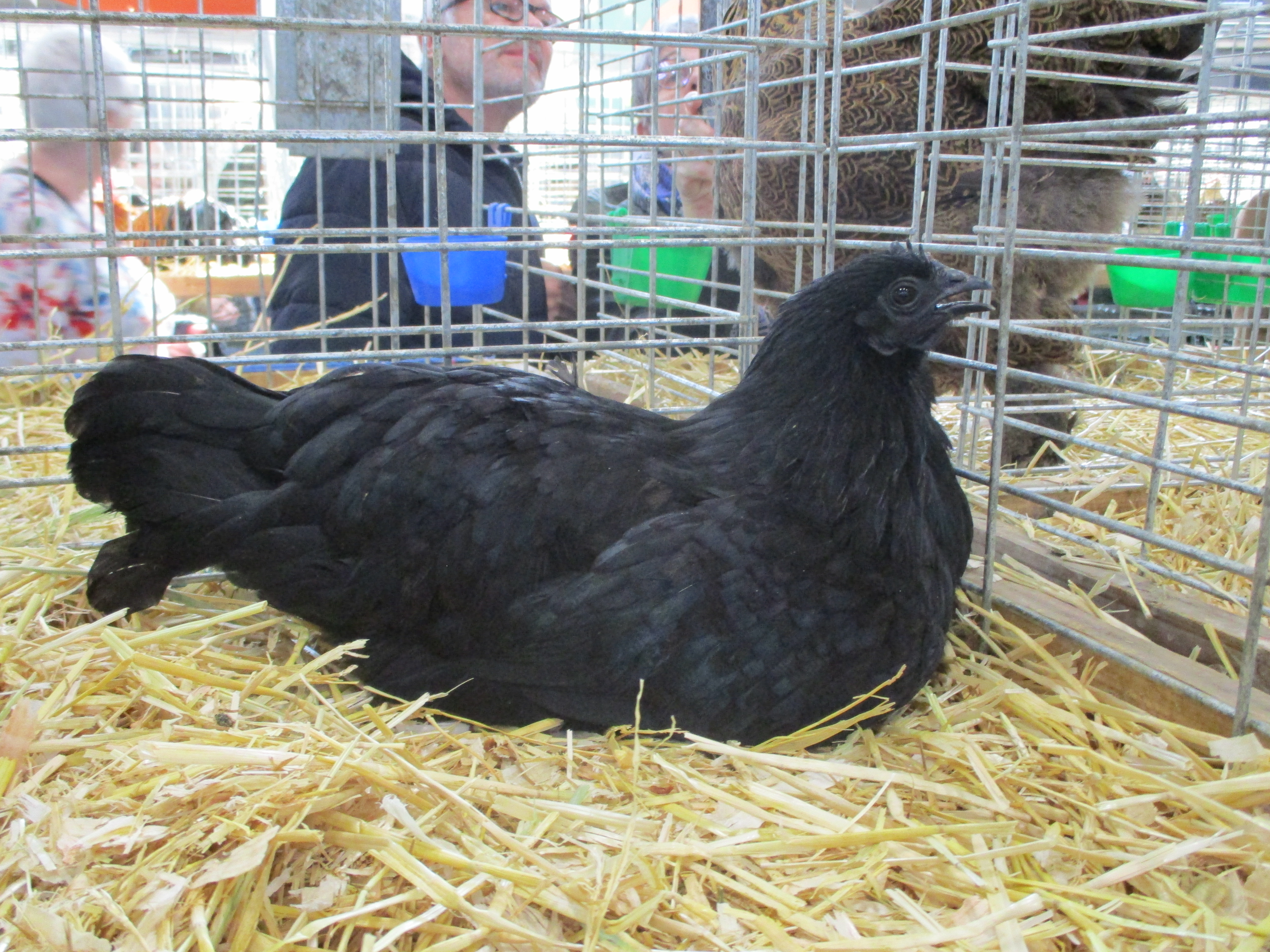
- Cemani hen
- Country of origin: Indonesia

Traits
- Weight: Male: 2.0–2.5 kg (4.4–5.5 lb); Female: 1.5–2.0 kg (3.3–4.4 lb)
- Skin color: Black with a turquoise glow on the rooster neck side and tail.
- Egg color: Tinted/cream/light blue
- Comb type: Single

Classification

Notes
- Though it is said that they have black blood, that is false information
- Chicken; Gallus gallus domesticus

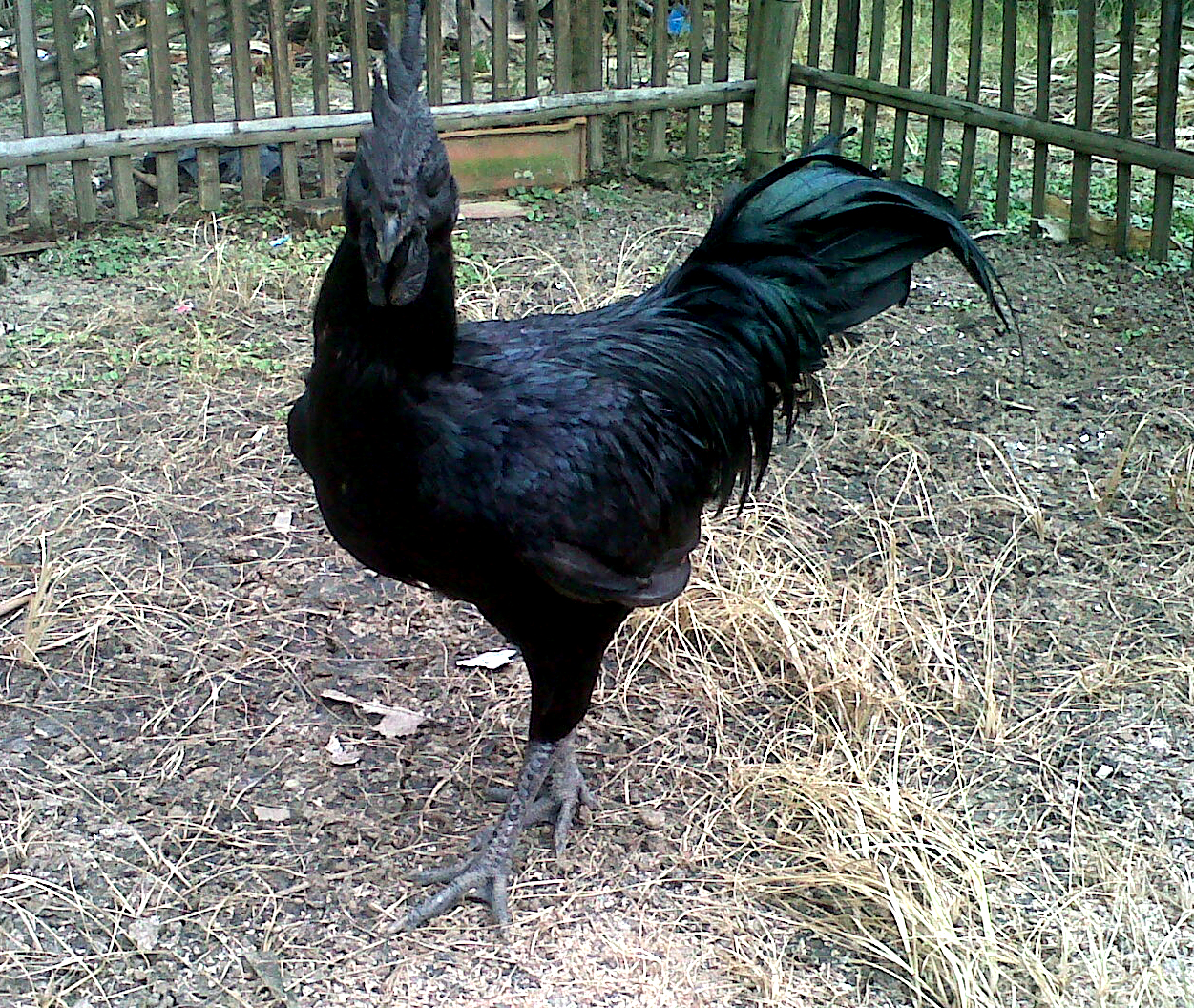
Cemani rooster

The Ayam Cemani is a rare breed of chicken from Indonesia. They have a dominant gene that causes hyperpigmentation (fibromelanosis), making the chicken mostly black, including feathers, beak, and internal organs. The Cemani is a very popular gamecock for cockfighting in Bali because their thighs have much more muscle compared to other chickens, which leads to them being much faster.

== Etymology ==
Ayam means "chicken" in Indonesian, while cemani (originally a Javanese word) means "thoroughly black" (down to the bones).

== Origin ==
As a pure Indonesian breed, the breed originated from the island of Java, Indonesia, and has probably been used since the 12th century for religious and mystical purposes.

The breed was described by Dutch colonial settlers and first imported to Europe in 1998 by Dutch breeder Jan Steverink. Currently, this breed of chicken is kept in the Netherlands, Belgium, Germany, Slovakia, Sweden, Italy, the United States and the Czech Republic. Ayam Cemani may have also been brought to Europe by Dutch seamen.

== Description ==
The optimal standard is that their beaks, tongues, combs and wattles appear black, and even their meat, internal organs, and bones are black or gray. They are medium-sized chickens known for their unique appearance. They are usually a somewhat friendly bird but they are still relatively skittish. The birds' black color occurs as a result of excess pigmentation of the tissues, caused by a genetic condition known as fibromelanosis. Fibromelanosis is also found in some other black or blue-skinned chicken breeds, such as the Silkie. This is due to a shared duplication of a segment of their 20th chromosome involving the endothelin 3 gene (EDN3). The roosters weigh 2–2.5 kg (4.4–5.5 lb) and the hens 1.5–2 kg (3.3–4.4 lb). The hens lay tinted or cream-colored eggs, although they are poor setters and rarely hatch their own brood. Eggs weigh an average of 45 g (1.6 oz). Average life expectancy is 6-8 years.

== Nutritional value ==
Compared to other Indonesian chickens, Ayam Cemani meat is higher in protein and lower in fat. It also is rich in antioxidants and has glucose-binding propertie As a result, their meat is typically more expensive than that of other chickens.

== See also ==
- Melanism
