= Crow Black Chicken =

Irish musical group

- Origin: Clonmel, County Tipperary, Ireland
- Genres: Blues rock
- Years active: 2009–present
- Members: Christy O'Hanlon; Stephen McGrath; George Barrett
- Website: crowblackchicken.com

Crow Black Chicken is a three-piece blues-rock band from Cork and Clonmel, Ireland composed of Christy O'Hanlon (vocals, guitar), Stephen McGrath (bass) and George Barrett (drums, vocals). Described as 'The hardest working band in Ireland', Crow Black Chicken has continued to build a following now known as the 'Crow Black Chicken Army'. Invited as guests to 'Electric Picnic' each and every year, their unique style of original music envelopes southern American blues-rock influence.

== History (2009 - present) ==
Crow Black Chicken formed in 2009, releasing their début album Electric Soup in 2012 and second album Rumble Shake in June 2014 which charted in the Irish Albums Chart at number 12 in its first week of being released.

== Members ==
- Christy O'Hanlon – Lead vocals, guitar
- Stephen McGrath – Bass
- George "Gev" Barrett - Drums, percussion, vocals

== Discography ==
Crow Black Chicken discography
- Studio albums: 3
- Live albums: 1
- Singles: 4
- Music videos: 4

=== Studio albums ===
Title	Details	Peak chart positions
Title	Details	IRE
Electric Soup	Released: 1 June 2012; Label: Self Released; Formats: CD, Download	—
Rumble Shake	Released: 6 June 2014; Label: Self Released; Formats: CD, Download	12
Pariah Brothers	Released: 15 July 2016; Label: Self Released; Formats: CD, Download	—
Ghost Dance	Released: 13 June 2025; Label: Self Released; Formats: CD, Download	—
"—" denotes a title that did not chart.

=== Live albums ===
Title	Album details
Deep South	Released: 2015; Label: Self Released; Formats: CD, Download
South Roman Street	Released: 2018; Label: Self Released; Formats: CD, Download

=== Singles ===
Year	Title	Peak chart position	Album
Year	Title	IRL	Album
2011	"White Lightning"	—	Electric Soup
2012	"Murmuration"	—	Electric Soup
2014	"Rumble Shake"	—	Rumble Shake
2015	"Priest Hunter"	—	Rumble Shake
"—" denotes a title that did not chart.
