= Kojii Helnwein =

Irish actress, musician and model

- Born: Kojii de Burca; Dublin, Ireland
- Occupations: Actress and model
- Spouse: Cyril Helnwein (m. 2005; div. 2021)
- Parent: Enda Wyatt
- Website: www.kojiihelnwein.com

Kojii Helnwein (/ˈkoʊdʒi ˈhɛlənwaɪn/; née de-Burca) is an Irish actress, musician and model.

== Early life and family ==
De Burca was born in Dublin, Ireland, the daughter of musician Enda Wyatt of Irish rock band An Emotional Fish. She was raised in Tallaght in south Dublin.

She studied technical stage training and worked as a freelance stage manager for four years in Irish theatres and a Parisian circus.

In 2004, Kojii met her now ex-husband, fine-art photographer Cyril Helnwein when she posed for his "Ethereal" series. Cyril Helnwein is the eldest son of Austrian artist Gottfried Helnwein. Kojii and Cyril were married in 2005 and divorced in 2021.

== Acting ==
Kojii studied acting in Los Angeles at the Acting Center and at the Irish Film Academy in Ireland.

Performances have included:

- Urban Traffik (pre-production)
- The O'Brien's, 2013
- The World Ends Without You (short), 2010
- Terra Incognita (2010), with Juliette Lewis and Michael Des Barres

== Modelling ==
Helnwein was engaged by Rebecca Morgan of Morgan the Agency in Ireland.

After her first modelling job for John Rocha Helnwein began working full-time in print, runway, and commercial modelling.

She has been seen in numerous magazines, including, Fit Pregnancy, Women's Wear Daily, Cosmopolitan, Elle, BPM, Prudence, Tatler and Vogue. She has appeared in adverts and catalogues for companies such as, O.P.I., Got2b, Louis Verdad, Ed Hardy, Coca-Cola, Toni and Guy and Gap.

Helnwein appears in national advertisements in the United States for clients such as Target, Mitsubishi, Comcast, Marshalls and in Ireland for clients such as O2, Pigsback and TV3. She has also become known in Ireland for a long-standing appearance in a TV3 ident where she is featured singing the networks jingle alongside her band.. There is also a horror version of the ident where the band nembers seriously injuire and in one case even kill each other

Helnwein's runway clients have included Prada, Jimmy Choo, Jeffrey Sebelia, Eduardo Lucero, A-Wear, Smet, GenArt and Whitley Kros to name just a few.

Helnwein appeared on Project Runway (Season 6) and the companion show Models of the Runway (Season 1). This show aired on Lifetime TV 20 August 2009. Kojii has also been regularly seen on RTÉ's Off The Rails, Late Late Show, and Live at 3, and TV3's Ireland AM

== Music ==
In 2006 Helnwein started touring with her band, also known as Kojii in Ireland. She sings, writes music and lyrics, and plays guitar. The same year she recorded and released a self-titled album, Kojii.
