= Kadaknath =

Breed of chicken

Kadaknath Chicken
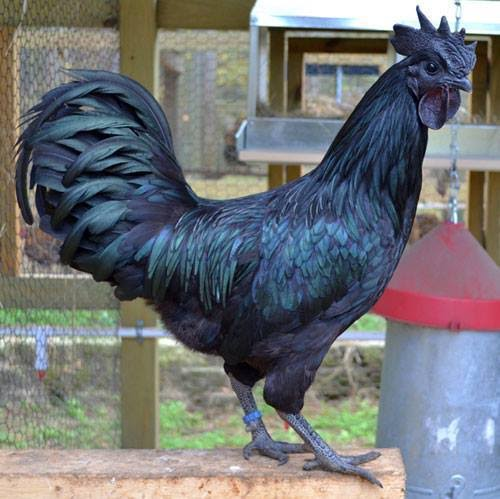
- Other names: Black chicken/black hen
- Nicknames: Kali Masi
- Country of origin: India
- Use: Dual-purpose breed: eggs, meat

Traits
- Weight: Male: 1.8kg - 2kg; Female: 1.2kg - 1.4kg
- Skin color: Greyish Black with a Turquoise glow
- Egg color: Cream

Classification

Kadaknath, also called Kali Masi ("fowl having black flesh"), is an Indian breed of chicken. They originated from Dhar and Jhabua, Madhya Pradesh. These birds are mostly bred by the rural and tribals. There are three varieties: jet black, golden and pencilled. The meat from this breed has a geographical indication (GI Tag) tag that was approved by the Indian government on 30 July 2018.

== Breed ==
The Kadaknath is popular for its adaptability and its grey-black meat, which is believed to infuse vigour. Its colour is caused by melanin. The breed is considered to have originated from the Kathiwar Alirajapur jungles in Jhabua district of Madhya Pradesh.

The roosters weigh 1.8–2 kg (4.0–4.4 lb) and the hens 1.2–1.5 kg (2.6–3.3 lb). Kadaknath hens' eggs are brown with a slightly pink tint; they are poor setters and rarely hatch their own brood. Eggs weigh an average of 30–35 g (1.1–1.2 oz).

=== Colour ===
Kadaknath birds are grey-black all over and have gold plumage with greenish iridescence. The greyish black colour is present in the legs and toenails, beak, tongue, comb and wattles; even the meat, bones, blood and organs have black colouration.

== Threat of extinction ==
Due to the relatively high consumption of the breed, its numbers have sharply declined throughout the years. To save the breed from extinction, the state government started a Kadaknath poultry breeding program involving 500 families who are below the poverty line, who were to receive financial support and assistance.

== Scams ==
Because of the limited availability and increased popularity of the breed since the mid-2000s, there have been multiple types of scams in which both poultry farmers and consumers have been swindled.
