= Late congenital syphilitic oculopathy =

- Specialty: Ophthalmology

Late congenital syphilitic oculopathy is a disease of the eye, a manifestation of late congenital syphilis.

== Signs and symptoms ==
It can appear as:

- Interstitial keratitis – this commonly appears between ages 6 and 12. Symptoms include lacrimation and photophobia. Pathological vascularization of the cornea cause it to turn pink or salmon colored. 90% of cases affect both eyes.
- Episcleritis or scleritis – nodules appear in or overlying the sclera (white of eye)
- Iritis or iris papules – vascular infiltration of the iris causes rosy color change and yellow/red nodules.
- Chorioretinitis, papillitis, retinal vasculitis – retinal changes can resemble retinitis pigmentosa.
- Exudative retinal detachment

Congenital syphilis is categorized by the age of the child. Early congenital syphilis occurs in children under 2 years old, and late congenital syphilis in children at or greater than 2 years old. Manifestations of late congenital syphilis are similar to those of secondary syphilis and tertiary syphilis in adults.
