= Red eye (medicine) =

Eye that appears red due to illness or injury

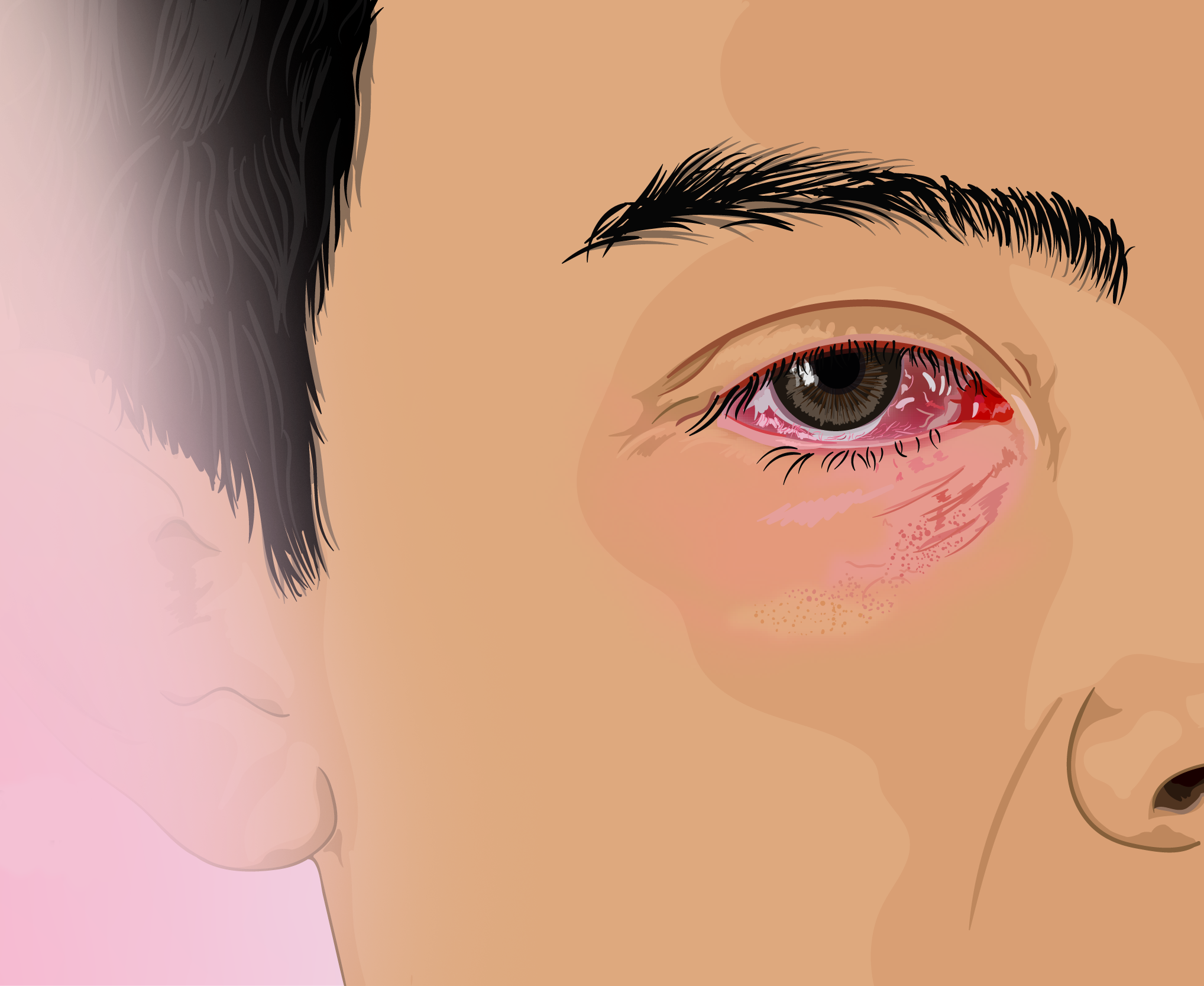
- Subconjunctival hemorrhage causing red coloration as result of ruptured blood vessel in the eye
- Specialty: Ophthalmology

A red eye is an eye that appears red due to illness or injury. It is usually injection and prominence of the superficial blood vessels of the conjunctiva, which may be caused by disorders of these or adjacent structures. Conjunctivitis and subconjunctival hemorrhage are two of the less serious but more common causes.

Management includes assessing whether emergency action (including referral) is needed, or whether treatment can be accomplished without additional resources.

Slit lamp examination is invaluable in diagnosis but initial assessment can be performed using a careful history, testing vision (visual acuity), and carrying out a penlight examination.

== Diagnosis ==
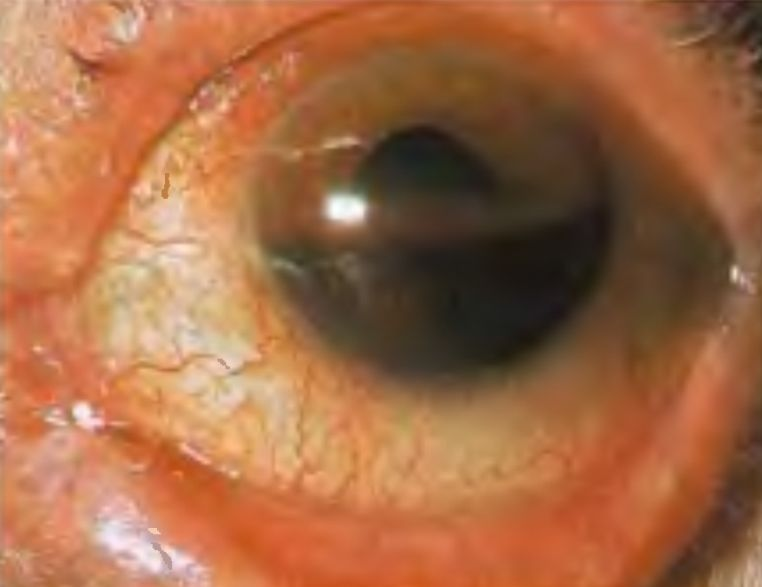
Hyphaema – showing blood filling the anterior chamber, causing a horizontal fluid level

Particular signs and symptoms may indicate that the cause is serious and requires immediate attention.

Seven such signs are:

- Reduced visual acuity
- Ciliary flush (circumcorneal injection)
- Corneal abnormalities including edema or opacities ("corneal haze")
- Corneal staining
- Pupil abormalities including abormal pupil size
- Abnormal intraocular pressure
- Severe pain

The most useful is a smaller pupil in the red eye than the non-red eye (opposite eye) and sensitivity to bright light.

=== Reduced visual acuity ===
A reduction in visual acuity in a 'red eye' is indicative of serious ocular disease, such as keratitis, iridocyclitis, and glaucoma, and never occurs in simple conjunctivitis without accompanying corneal involvement.

=== Ciliary flush ===
Ciliary flush is usually present in eyes with corneal inflammation, iridocyclitis or acute glaucoma, though not simple conjunctivitis. A ciliary flush is a ring of red or violet spreading out from around the cornea of the eye.

=== Corneal abnormalities ===
The cornea is required to be transparent to transmit light to the retina. Because of injury, infection or inflammation, an area of opacity may develop which can be seen with a penlight or slit lamp. In rare instances, this opacity is congenital. In some, there is a family history of corneal growth disorders which may be progressive with age. Much more commonly, misuse of contact lenses may be a precipitating factor. Whichever, it is always potentially serious and sometimes necessitates urgent treatment and corneal opacities are the fourth leading cause of blindness. Opacities may be keratic, that is, due to the deposition of inflammatory cells, hazy, usually from corneal edema, or they may be localized in the case of corneal ulcer or keratitis.
Corneal epithelial disruptions may be detected with fluorescein staining of the eye, and careful observation with cobalt-blue light. Corneal epithelial disruptions would stain green, which represents some injury of the corneal epithelium. These types of disruptions may be due to corneal inflammations or physical trauma to the cornea, such as a foreign body.

=== Pupillary abnormalities ===
In an eye with iridocyclitis, (inflammation of both the iris and ciliary body), the involved pupil will be smaller than the uninvolved, due to reflex muscle spasm of the iris sphincter muscle. Generally, conjunctivitis does not affect the pupils. With acute angle-closure glaucoma, the pupil is generally fixed in mid-position, oval, and responds sluggishly to light, if at all.

Shallow anterior chamber depth may indicate a predisposition to one form of glaucoma (narrow angle) but requires slit-lamp examination or other special techniques to determine it.

In the presence of a "red eye", a shallow anterior chamber may indicate acute glaucoma, which requires immediate attention.

=== Abnormal intraocular pressure ===
Intraocular pressure should be measured as part of a routine eye examination. It is usually only elevated by iridocyclitis or acute-closure glaucoma, but not by relatively benign conditions. In iritis and traumatic perforating ocular injuries, the intraocular pressure is usually low.

=== Severe pain ===
Those with conjunctivitis may report mild irritation or scratchiness, but never extreme pain, which is an indicator of more serious disease such as keratitis, corneal ulceration, iridocyclitis, or acute glaucoma.

=== Differential diagnosis ===
Of the many causes, conjunctivitis is the most common. Others include:

==== Usually nonurgent ====
- airborne eye irritants
- blepharitis – a usually chronic inflammation of the eyelids with scaling, sometimes resolving spontaneously
- drugs: medications or recreational drug use
  - Cannabis
- dry eye syndrome – caused by either decreased tear production or increased tear film evaporation which may lead to irritation and redness
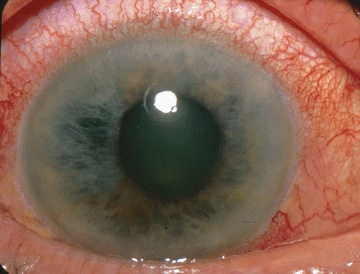
  Acute glaucoma, angle closure type
- subconjunctival hemorrhage – a sometimes dramatic, but usually harmless, bleeding underneath the conjunctiva most often from spontaneous rupture of the small, fragile blood vessels, commonly from a cough or sneeze
- inflamed pterygium – a benign, triangular, horizontal growth of the conjunctiva, arising from the inner side, at the level of contact of the upper and lower eyelids, associated with exposure to sunlight, low humidity and dust. It may be more common in occupations such as farming and welding.
- inflamed pinguecula – a yellow-white deposit close to the junction between the cornea and sclera, on the conjunctiva. It is most prevalent in tropical climates with much UV exposure. Although harmless, it can occasionally become inflamed.
- tiredness
- episcleritis – most often a mild, inflammatory disorder of the 'white' of the eye unassociated with eye complications in contrast to scleritis, and responding to topical medications such as anti-inflammatory drops.

==== Usually urgent ====
- acute closed-angle glaucoma – implies injury to the optic nerve with the potential for irreversible vision loss which may be permanent unless treated quickly, as a result of increased pressure within the eyeball. Not all forms of glaucoma are acute, and not all are associated with increased intraocular pressure.
- eye injury
- keratitis – a potentially serious inflammation or injury to the cornea (window), often associated with significant pain, light intolerance, and deterioration in vision. Numerous causes include virus infection. Injury from contact lenses can lead to keratitis.

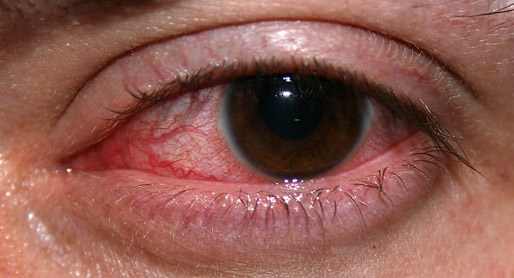
Eye with iritis showing ciliary flush

- iritis – together with the ciliary body and choroid, the iris makes up the uvea, part of the middle, pigmented, structures of the eye. Inflammation of this layer (uveitis) requires urgent control and is estimated to be responsible for 10% of blindness in the United States.
- scleritis – a serious inflammatory condition, often painful, that can result in permanent vision loss, and without an identifiable cause in half of those presenting with it. About 30–40% have an underlying systemic autoimmune condition.
- tick-borne illnesses like Rocky Mountain spotted fever – the eye is not primarily involved, but the presence of conjunctivitis, along with fever and rash, may help with the diagnosis in appropriate circumstances.

== See also ==
- List of eye diseases and disorders
- Ocular straylight
