= Recurrent corneal erosion =

Separation of the cellular layers of the cornea of the eye

- Other names: Recurrent corneal erosion syndrome
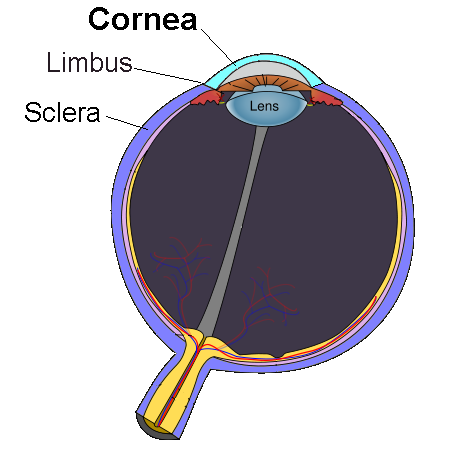
- Anatomy (normal) cornea
- Specialty: Ophthalmology
- Symptoms: Pain, photophobia
- Usual onset: Usually at night or around upon first awakening
- Duration: Potentially chronic
- Causes: Weak attachments of the basal epithelium and basement membrane with the underlying Bowman's layer
- Risk factors: Previous injury, corneal dystrophies (e.g., epithelial basement membrane dystrophy, and granular corneal dystrophy)
- Treatment: Eye lubrication, therapeutic contact lens, Phototherapeutic keratectomy, diamond burr polishing
- Prognosis: Generally good

Recurrent corneal erosion (RCE) is a disorder of the eyes characterized by the failure of the cornea's outermost layer of epithelial cells to attach to the underlying basement membrane (Bowman's layer). The condition is excruciatingly painful because the loss of these cells results in the exposure of sensitive corneal nerves. This condition can often leave patients with temporary blindness due to extreme light sensitivity (photophobia).

== Signs and symptoms ==
Symptoms include recurring attacks of severe acute ocular pain, foreign-body sensation, photophobia (i.e. sensitivity to bright lights), and tearing often at the time of awakening or during sleep when the eyelids are rubbed or opened. Signs of the condition include corneal abrasion or localized roughening of the corneal epithelium, sometimes with map-like lines, epithelial dots or microcysts, or fingerprint patterns. An epithelial defect may be present, usually in the inferior interpalpebral zone.

== Cause ==
Most cases of recurrent corneal erosion are acquired. There is often a history of recent corneal injury, such as corneal abrasion or ulcer, but also may be idiopathic or due to corneal dystrophy or corneal disease. In other words, one may develop corneal erosions as a result of another disorder, such as epithelial basement membrane dystrophy (EBMD).

Familial corneal erosions occur in dominantly inherited recurrent corneal erosion dystrophy (ERED) in which COL17A1 gene is mutated.

== Diagnosis ==
The erosion may be seen by an eye doctor using the magnification of a biomicroscope or slit lamp. Usually fluorescein stain must be applied first and a cobalt blue-light used, but may not be necessary if the area of the epithelial defect is large. Optometrists and ophthalmologists have access to the slit lamp microscopes that allow for this more-thorough evaluation under the higher magnification. Mis-diagnosis of a scratched cornea is fairly common, especially in younger patients.

== Prevention ==
Given that episodes tend to occur on awakening and managed by use of good 'wetting agents', approaches to be taken to help prevent episodes include:

Environmental

- ensuring that the air is humidified rather than dry, not overheated and without excessive airflow over the face. Also avoiding irritants such as cigarette smoke.
- use of protective glasses especially when gardening or playing with children.

General personal measures

- maintaining general hydration levels with adequate fluid intake.
- not sleeping-in late as the cornea tends to dry out the longer the eyelids are closed.

Pre-bed routine

- routine use of long-lasting eye ointments applied before going to bed.
- occasional use of the anti-inflammatory eyedrop FML (prescribed by an ophthalmologist or optometrist) before going to bed if the affected eye feels inflamed, dry or gritty
- use of a hyperosmotic (hypertonic) ointment before bed reduces the amount of water in the epithelium, strengthening its structure
- use the pressure patch as mentioned above.
- use surgical tape to keep the eye closed (if Nocturnal Lagophthalmos is a factor)

Waking options

- learn to wake with eyes closed and still and keeping artificial tear drops within reach so that they may be squirted under the inner corner of the eyelids if the eyes feel uncomfortable upon waking.
- It has also been suggested that the eyelids should be rubbed gently, or pulled slowly open with your fingers, before trying to open them, or keeping the affected eye closed while "looking" left and right to help spread lubricating tears. If the patient's eyelids feel stuck to the cornea on waking and no intense pain is present, use a fingertip to press firmly on the eyelid to push the eye's natural lubricants onto the affected area. This procedure frees the eyelid from the cornea and prevents tearing of the cornea.

== Treatment ==
With the eye generally profusely watering, the type of tears being produced have little adhesive property. Water or saline eye drops tend therefore to be ineffective. Rather a 'better quality' of tear is required with higher 'wetting ability' (i.e. greater amount of glycoproteins) and so artificial tears (e.g. viscotears) are applied frequently.

Nocturnal Lagophthalmos (where the eyelids do not close enough to cover the eye completely during sleep) may be an exacerbating factor, in which case using surgical tape to keep the eye closed at night can help.

Whilst individual episodes may settle within a few hours or days, additional episodes (as the name suggests) will recur at intervals.

Where episodes frequently occur, or there is an underlying disorder, one medical, or three types of surgical curative procedures may be attempted: use of therapeutic contact lens, controlled puncturing of the surface layer of the eye (Anterior Stromal Puncture) and laser phototherapeutic keratectomy (PTK). These all essentially try to allow the surface epithelium to reestablish with normal binding to the underlying basement membrane, the method chosen depends upon the location and size of the erosion.

=== Surgical ===
A punctal plug may be inserted into the tear duct by an optometrist or ophthalmologist, decreasing the removal of natural tears from the affected eye.

The use of contact lenses may help prevent the abrasion during blinking lifting off the surface layer and uses thin lenses that are gas permeable to minimise reduced oxygenation. However they need to be used for between 8–26 weeks and such persistent use both incurs frequent follow-up visits and may increase the risk of infections.

Alternatively, under local anaesthetic, the corneal layer may be gently removed with a fine needle, cauterised (heat or laser) or 'spot welding' attempted (again with lasers). The procedures are not guaranteed to work, and in a minority may exacerbate the problem.

Anterior Stromal Puncture with a 20-25 gauge needle is an effective and simple treatment.

An option for minimally invasive and long-term effective therapy is laser phototherapeutic keratectomy. Laser PTK involves the surgical laser treatment of the cornea to selectively ablate cells on the surface layer of the cornea. It is thought that the natural regrowth of cells in the following days are better able to attach to the basement membrane to prevent recurrence of the condition. Laser PTK has been found to be most effective after epithelial debridement for the partial ablation of Bowman's lamella, which performed prior to PTK in the surgical procedure. This is meant to smoothen out the corneal area that the laser PTK will then treat. In some cases, small-spot PTK, which only treats certain areas of the cornea may also be an acceptable alternative.

Amniotic membrane tissue corneal bandages such as Prokera have been shown to be effective in alleviating RCE. These bandages aid in ocular surface regeneration while simultaneously protecting the cornea from further irritation.

=== Medical ===
People with recalcitrant recurrent corneal erosions often show increased levels of matrix metalloproteinase (MMP) enzymes. These enzymes dissolve the basement membrane and fibrils of the hemidesmosomes, which can lead to the separation of the epithelial layer. Treatment with oral tetracycline antibiotics (such as doxycycline or oxytetracycline) together with a topical corticosteroid (such as prednisolone), reduce MMP activity and may rapidly resolve and prevent further episodes in cases unresponsive to conventional therapies. Some have now proposed this as the first line therapy after lubricants have failed.

There is a lack of good quality evidence to guide treatment choices. A recently updated Cochrane Review concluded that "Studies included in this review have been of insufficient size and quality to provide firm evidence to inform the development of management guidelines."

== See also ==
- Corneal ulcers in dogs
