= Corneal tattooing =

Tattoo located on the cornea of the bearer's eye

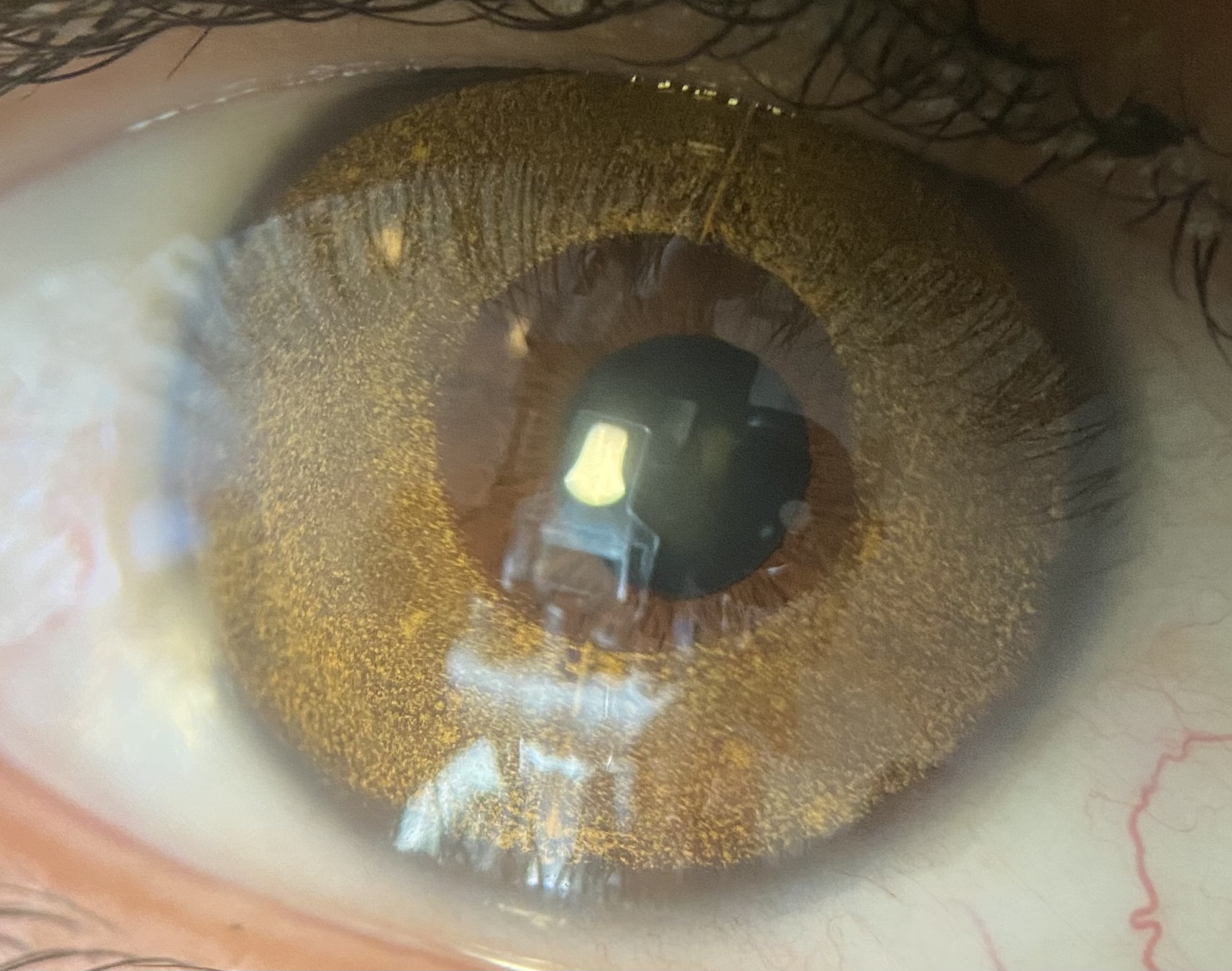
Corneal tattooing performed using a femtosecond laser. Honey-gold color

Corneal tattooing (or keratopigmentation) is the practice of tattooing the cornea of the human eye. Reasons for this practice include improvement of cosmetic appearance and the improvement of sight. Many different methods and procedures exist today, and there are varying opinions concerning the safety or success of this practice.

== Reasons for corneal tattooing ==
Causes or reasons for corneal tattooing vary from patient to patient. Most patients receive treatment to alter the cosmetic appearance of their eyes following disease or accident. Others receive treatment for optical purposes, including decreasing circumstantial glare within the iris. Corneal opacities are the leading reason for undergoing cosmetic tattooing.

=== Reconstructive cosmetic purposes ===
The leading reason for corneal tattooing is to alter the appearance of the eye cosmetically. Usually, the need for this alteration stems from corneal opacity. Corneal opacities (scarring of the cornea that creates an opaque or semi-transparent area on the eye) may be caused by leucoma, keratitis or cataracts. Such opacities can be cosmetically disruptive for patients in their everyday lives. Tattooing the cornea can alter a discoloration, blending an opacity into the normal eye color. Most physicians agree that the procedure should be performed only on patients who have lost their vision or who do not expect to recover it.

=== Optical purposes ===
Occasionally, corneal tattooing is performed when it might improve eyesight. According to Dr. Samuel Lewis Ziegler, indications for treatment include albinism, aniridia, coloboma, iridodialysis, keratoconus, or diffused nebulae of the cornea. Corneal tattooing is also performed on patients who still have vision to reduce symptomatic glare associated with large iridectomies or traumatic iris loss.

=== Aesthetic purposes: Changing eye color through keratopigmentation ===
Keratopigmentation for aesthetic purposes, also known as FLAAK (Femtosecond Laser Aesthetic Annular Keratopigmentation) is an intervention performed in patients who want to change the color of their eyes. This technique has become increasingly popular on social media and was first used for purely cosmetic purposes on healthy eyes by the French ophthalmologist Francis Ferrari.

== History ==
Corneal tattooing has been practiced for almost 2000 years, first mentioned in history by Galen, a 2nd-century physician.

=== Ancient practice ===
Galen of Pergamon, a Greek physician and philosopher, first described corneal tattooing in 150 AD, and the same procedure was later described by Aetius in 450 AD as an attempt to mask the leucomatous opacities of the eye. Both physicians would cauterize the corneal surface with a heated stilet. After the cauterization, they would apply the dye to the eye, using a variety of dyes, such as powdered nutgalls and iron (see iron gall ink) or pulverized pomegranate bark mixed with copper salt. This would then stain the cornea, correcting the cosmetic appearance for the patient. Other sources have mentioned that Galen might have used copper sulphate. This procedure was probably used only on those patients with an unsightly corneal leukoma.

=== Development of procedures ===
After Galen and Aetius, the practice is not mentioned until 1869, when oculoplastic surgeon Louis de Wecker introduced a new method. De Wecker, as he was also known, was the first to use black India ink to tattoo a leukoma of the eye. He applied cocaine to the eye as a topical anesthetic, coated the cornea with a thick solution of ink, and inserted pigment into the corneal tissue obliquely with a grooved needle. His method has influenced all subsequent methods.

Ziegler cites several physicians who contributed to the development of corneal tattooing. Some created new instruments to enhance the tattoo process. Taylor introduced one such method. He created a bundle of needles to tattoo the eye, instead of using a single needle; De Wecker found this method to be more practical. In 1901, Nieden introduced a method that used a tattooing needle based on the idea of a fountain pen, or something similar to the Edison electric pen. He found that this electrical needle operated more rapidly and reliably than traditional methods of tattooing. Another physician, Armaignac, used a small funnel that he fixed to the cornea by three small points. He would then put China ink into the instrument and tattoo with a needle. Armaignac claimed that his method produced a perfectly round pupil in one sitting. Other physicians, such as Victor Morax, did not tattoo the cornea, but changed its appearance using other methods. Morax split the corneal tissue into two vertical layers, introducing the coloring substance under the pedicle flap and placing a compressive dressing over the eye. Various methods have been introduced throughout history, collectively evolving into several mainstream methods that have proven to be the most effective to date.

== Methods ==
Several different methods exist today. Generally in most procedures, the dyeing agent is applied directly to the cornea. The physician then inserts the needle into the eye to inject the dye into the cornea. Physicians agree that the tattoo should be injected intramellarly or laterally, which provides an appearance of a uniform color and minimizes the chance of an irritable eye.

The methods used to apply the ink to the cornea differ. In one such method, the physician applies the ink into the cornea stroma by multiple punctures, covering the needle with ink each time. In another method, the physician would cover a three-edged spatula needle with ink before each puncture. He would then apply the ink into the anterior corneal stroma with each puncture. Samuel Theobald would inject the eye first with a needle and then rub in the ink with a Daviel curet. This would prevent against the often obscure field of operation known to other physicians and also prevent against repetitive irrigation sometimes needed.

Another method, introduced by Arif O. Khan and David Meyer in an article in the American Journal of Ophthalmology, suggests the removal of the corneal epithelium first. The physician would then place a piece of filter paper soaked in platinum chloride 2% onto the area for two minutes, followed by a second piece of filter paper soaked in hydrazine 2% applied for 25 seconds. William Thomson practiced corneal tattooing in a method similar to Nieden. He used a small steel pen manufactured by Joseph Gillott, with the point converted into the cutting surface. The barrel would receive ink for the entire operation, avoiding the need to refill the ink or to recover the needle with ink. This method would avoid the disadvantages of other methods in which the ink impeded the physician's ability to control where the ink spread, which impeded the sight of the cornea to the physician. A plethora of methods exist today with varying techniques and instruments.

=== Inks ===
Many different types of inks are used throughout history and today for the dyeing of the cornea. Today, India ink is the most commonly used, providing safe and long-lasting effects, but other dyes include metallic colors in powder form, various organic dyes, and uveal pigment from animal eyes. Two different methods exist: dyeing with gold or platinum chloride and carbon impregnation.

Walter Sekundo et al., in the British Journal of Ophthalmology, say that dyeing is easier and quicker than carbon impregnation, but it fades more rapidly than non-metallic tattooing. The West mainly uses dyeing. Some dyes that are commonly used are platinum or gold chloride, which provide a jet black stain.

Carbon impregnation includes the use of India ink, Chinese ink, lamp black ink, and other organic dyes. Snejina Vassileva and Evgeniya Hristakieva, both faculty members at universities in Bulgaria, say that India ink is safe and long lasting when properly diluted and is the most commonly used today.

== Advantages and disadvantages ==
=== Advantages ===
Some advantages of corneal tattooing include the success and minimum recovery process. Ji-Eun Lee et al., in an article from Acta Ophthalmologica Scandinavica, say, "Corneal tattooing by intrastromal injection of India ink into the amniotic membrane space may be a very useful method of achieving a good cosmetic report." Often, the process is extremely successful and reduces the cosmetic disruption of any corneal opacity. Corneal tattooing may also reduce a glare within the eye due to iris loss and increase visual acuity. J.N. Roy, a professor at the University of Montreal, wrote in the Canadian Medical Association Journal, "Placing a bandage over the tattooed eye is not indicated; ordinary coloured glasses are amply sufficient." Treatment after the procedure itself is limited, according to Roy, to colored glasses.

=== Disadvantages ===
Some of the disadvantages of corneal tattooing are the difficulty of performing the procedure and the risk of the procedure. Corneal tattooing is a procedure that is very difficult to perform precisely. Often, the area tattooed fades after time and rarely remains permanently. The size of the area tattooed also might reduce over time. Sometimes, the results are not what were expected, and the eye might need to be re-tattooed. Also, results may not last very long because of the multiple incisions, and the multiple lacerations might cause recurrent corneal erosions. Finally, not all leucoma respond to the tattooing. J.N. Roy says, "All leucomas do not equally respond to intervention, which must be done only on those which present old, solid and flat corneal cicatrices."

There are also some considerable dangers linked to corneal tattooing. Going blind from the attempt of the procedure is a possibility. Some patients complain of slight redness and that it feels like something is in their eye. The ink might not remain in the cornea and could possibly cause keratitis. Other complications include "toxic reaction, iridocyclitis, persistent corneal epithelial defects, and corneal ulceration." Physicians may also run into problems such as fading, reduction in size, and short-term results.

== Advances in technology ==
Advances in technology have decreased the actual practice of corneal tattooing over the years. Instead, some of the following methods are used to disguise any corneal scarring: corneal grafting, keratoplasty techniques, and tinted contact lenses. Also, advances in technology have decreased the probability of developing a dense corneal leucoma, such as chemotherapy, antibiotics, and the avoidance of "heroic measures of therapy." Although such advances in technology have decreased the popularity of corneal tattooing, some still practice it. Sekundo et al. believe that the combination of new technology and old techniques might increase the popularity of tattooing in the future. More recently Jorge Alió described a technique combining keratopigmentation and the use of a femtosecond laser in the treatment of essential iris atrophy. This technique was first used for purely cosmetic purposes on healthy eyes by Francis Ferrari.

== Alternative methods ==
An alternative way to permanently change the color of the eye is called BrightOcular, which is achieved by placing an artificial silicone lens on top of the original iris. The clients can choose from a variety of colors and different designs and images. The method also makes it possible to remove the implant later in life to get the original eye color back. This implant technique frequently leads to serious complications.

== See also ==
- Scleral tattooing
