= Scleritis =

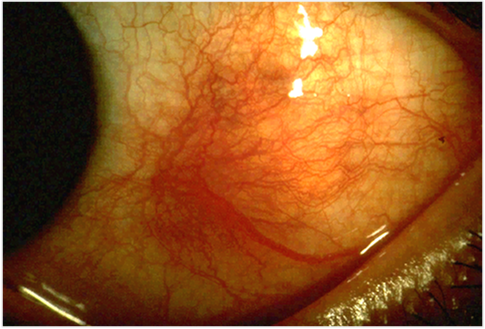
- Inflammation of entire thickness of the sclera
- Specialty: Ophthalmology, Optometry
- Symptoms: Eye redness, pain, photophobia, tearing, decrease in visual acuity
- Usual onset: 30 - 60 years of age
- Risk factors: Female gender
- Differential diagnosis: Episcleritis
- Treatment: Non-steroidal anti-inflammatory drugs Surgery (rarely needed)
- Frequency: Uncommon

Scleritis is a serious inflammatory disease that affects the white outer coating of the eye, known as the sclera. The disease is often contracted through association with other diseases of the body, such as granulomatosis with polyangiitis or rheumatoid arthritis. There are three types of scleritis: diffuse scleritis (the most common), nodular scleritis, and necrotizing scleritis (the most severe). Scleritis may be the first symptom of onset of connective tissue disease.

Episcleritis is inflammation of the episclera, a less serious condition that seldom develops into scleritis.

== Signs and symptoms ==
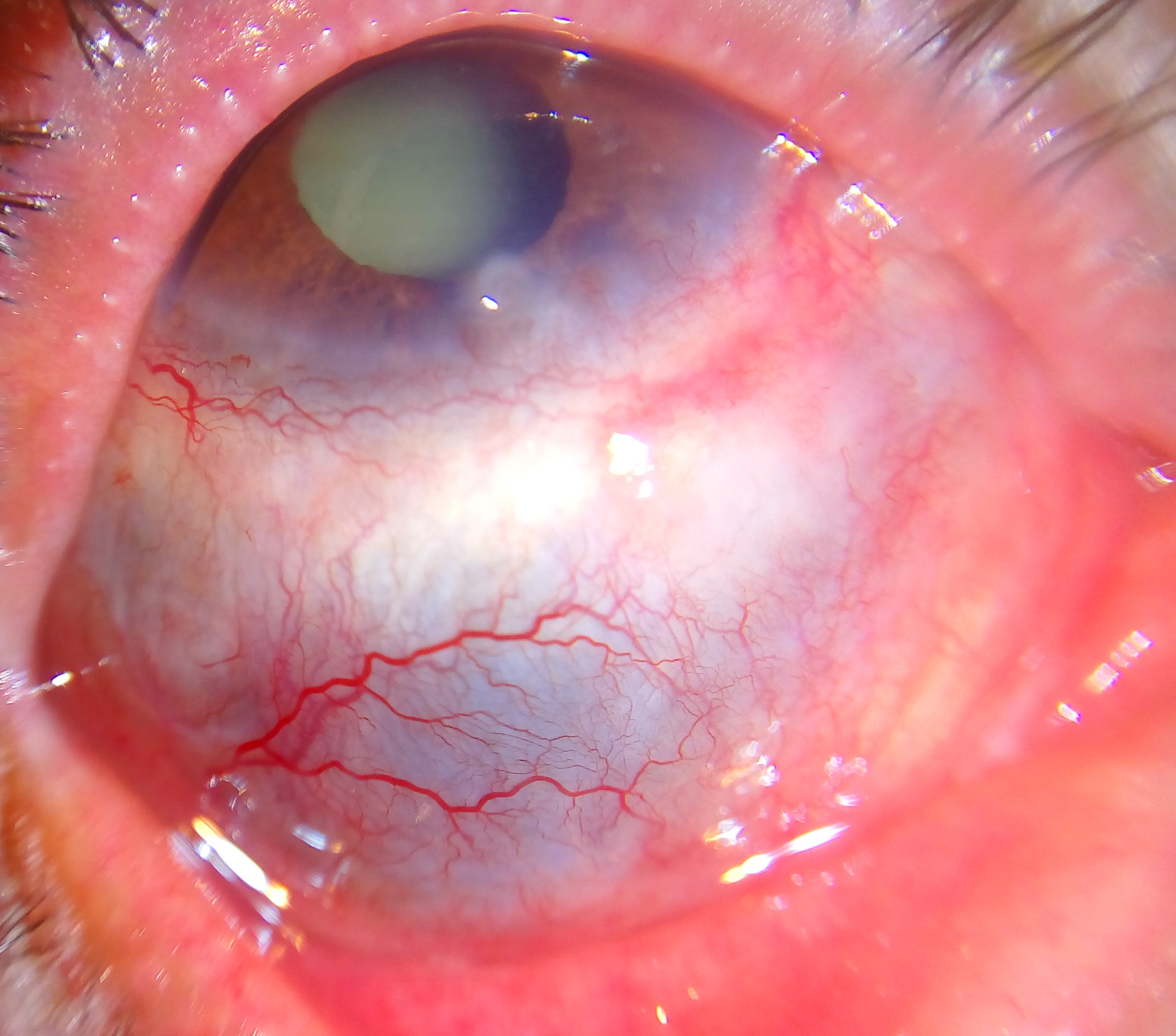
Scleral translucency following recurrent scleritis.

Symptoms of scleritis include:

- Redness of the sclera and conjunctiva, sometimes changing to a purple hue
- Severe ocular pain, which may radiate to the temple or jaw. The pain is often described as deep or boring.
- Photophobia and tearing
- Decrease in visual acuity, possibly leading to blindness

The pain of episcleritis is less severe than in scleritis. In hyperemia, there is a visible increase in the blood flow to the sclera (hyperaemia), which accounts for the redness of the eye. Unlike in conjunctivitis, this redness will not move with gentle pressure to the conjunctiva.

=== Complications ===
Secondary keratitis or uveitis may occur with scleritis. The most severe complications are associated with necrotizing scleritis.

== Pathophysiology ==
Most of the time, scleritis is not caused by an infectious agent. Histopathological changes are that of a chronic granulomatous disorder, characterized by fibrinoid necrosis, infiltration by polymorphonuclear cells, lymphocytes, plasma cells and macrophages. The granuloma is surrounded by multinucleated epitheloid giant cells and new vessels, some of which may show evidence of vasculitis.

== Diagnosis ==
Scleritis is best detected by examining the sclera in daylight; retracting the lids helps determine the extent of involvement. Other aspects of the eye exam (i.e. visual acuity testing, slit lamp examination, etc.) may be normal. Scleritis may be differentiated from episcleritis by using phenylephrine eye drops, which causes blanching of the blood vessels in episcleritis, but not in scleritis.

Ancillary tests CT scans, MRIs, and ultrasonographies can be helpful, but do not replace the physical examination.

=== Classification ===
Scleritis can be classified as anterior scleritis and posterior scleritis. Anterior scleritis is the most common variety, accounting for about 98% of the cases. It is of two types : Non-necrotising and necrotising. Non-necrotising scleritis is the most common, and is further classified into diffuse and nodular type based on morphology. Necrotising scleritis accounts for 13% of the cases. It can occur with or without inflammation.

== Treatment ==
=== Medical ===
In mild to moderate cases of scleritis, non-steroidal anti-inflammatory drugs (NSAIDs) such as flurbiprofen, indomethacin or ibuprofen may be prescribed for pain relief. Systemic corticosteroids like prednisolone may be used if NSAIDs are inappropriate or scleritis is posterior or necrotizing. Periocular steroid injections may be used in non-necrotizing scleritis but are contraindicated in necrotizing disease. If disease control is inadequate with steroids alone, immunosuppressives (e.g., cyclophosphamide, azathioprine, and methotrexate) and/or immunomodulators may be considered for treatment. In infective scleritis, if the infective agent is identified, topical or systemic antibiotics may be prescribed.

=== Surgical intervention ===
Surgery may be indicated if scleral perforation or excessive scleral thinning is present. Bandage contact lens or corneal glue may be used to repair damaged corneal tissue in the eye and preserve the patient's vision. If not treated, scleritis can cause blindness.

== Epidemiology ==
Scleritis is not a common disease, although the exact prevalence and incidence are unknown. It is somewhat more common in women, and is most common in the fourth to sixth decades of life.
