= PTK =

PTK may refer to:

- Pairwise Transient Key, a key in the IEEE 802.11i WPA2 specification
- Phi Theta Kappa, an international honor society
- Phototherapeutic keratectomy, laser eye surgery
- Pilotiruemyi Transportny Korabl Novogo Pokoleniya (PTK NP, lit. "New Generation Piloted Transport Ship"), a Roscosmos program to develop a reusable spacecraft
- Portal Three Kingdoms, a Magic: The Gathering card set
- Post and Telecom of Kosovo
- Protein Tyrosine Kinase, an enzyme
- Oakland County International Airport, a county-owned public-use airport located in Waterford, Michigan with IATA Code PTK
- P, T and K, the most common voiceless plosive consonants across all languages
