= Vernal keratoconjunctivitis =

- Other names: Spring catarrh; Vernal catarrh; Warm weather conjunctivitis
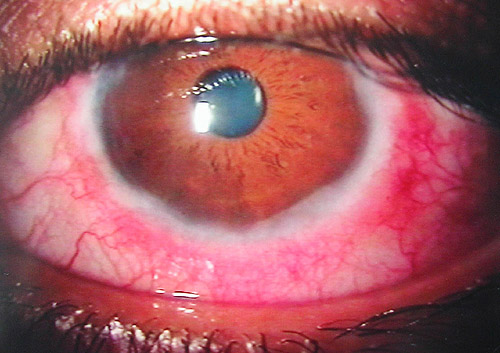
- Some of the cornea and conjunctiva findings in vernal conjunctivitis
- Specialty: Ophthalmology

Vernal keratoconjunctivitis (VKC, also Spring catarrh, Vernal catarrh or Warm weather conjunctivitis) is a recurrent, bilateral, and self-limiting type of conjunctivitis (pink eye) having a periodic seasonal incidence.

== Types ==
Corneal involvement in VKC may be primary or secondary due to extension of limbal lesions. Vernal keratopathy includes 5 types of lesions.

1. Punctuate epithelial keratitis.
2. Ulcerative vernal keratitis (shield ulceration).
3. Vernal corneal plaques.
4. Subepithelial scarring.
5. Pseudogerontoxon.

== Signs and symptoms ==
- Symptoms – VKC is characterised by marked burning and itchy sensations which may be intolerable and accentuates when patient comes in a warm humid atmosphere. Associated symptoms include mild photophobia in case of corneal involvement, lacrimation, stringy discharge and heaviness of eyelids.
- Signs of VKC can be described in three clinical forms (Cameron Classification):
1. Palpebral form – Usually upper tarsal conjunctiva of both the eyes is involved. Typical lesion is characterized by the presence of hard, flat-topped papillae arranged in cobblestone or pavement stone fashion. In severe cases papillae undergo hypertrophy to produce cauliflower-like excrescences of 'giant papillae'.
2. Bulbar form – It is characterised by dusky red triangular congestion of bulbar conjunctiva in palpebral area, gelatinous thickened accumulation of tissue around limbus and presence of discrete whitish raised dots along the limbus (Tranta's spots).
3. Mixed form – Shows the features of both palpebral and bulbar types.

== Cause ==
VKC is thought to be an allergic disorder in which IgE mediated mechanism play a role. Such patients often give family history of other atopic diseases such as hay fever, asthma or eczema, and their peripheral blood shows eosinophilia and increased serum IgE levels.

== Risk factors ==
- Age and sex – 4–20 years; more common in boys than girls.
- Season – More common in summer. Hence, the name Spring catarrh is a misnomer. Recently it is being labelled as Warm weather conjunctivitis.
- Climate – More prevalent in the tropics. VKC cases are mostly seen in hot months of summer, therefore, more suitable term for this condition is "summer catarrh" Ref.

== Pathology ==
- Conjunctival epithelium undergoes hyperplasia and sends downward projection into sub-epithelial tissue.
- Adenoid layer shows marked cellular infiltration by eosinophils, lymphocytes, plasma cells and histiocytes.
- Fibrous layer show proliferation which later undergoes hyaline changes.
- Conjunctival vessels also show proliferation, increased permeability and vasodilation.

== Diagnosis ==
=== Classification ===
Based on severity, authors have classified VKC into clinical grades:

Grade 0 - Absence of symptoms

Grade 1 MILD - Symptoms but no corneal involvement

Grade 2 MODERATE - Symptoms with photophobia but no corneal involvement

Grade 3 SEVERE - Symptoms, photophobia, mild to moderate SPK's OR with Diffuse SPK or corneal ulcer

== Treatment ==
- Local therapy – Topical steroids are effective. Commonly used solutions are of fluorometholone, medrysone, betamethasone or dexamethasone. Mast cell stabilizers such as sodium cromoglycate (2%) drops 4–5 times a day are quite effective in controlling VKC, especially atopic ones. Azelastine eyedrops are also effective. Topical antihistamines can be used. Acetyl cysteine (0.5%) used topically has mucolytic properties and is useful in the treatment of early plaque formation. Topical Cyclosporine is reserved for unresponsive cases.
- Systemic therapy – Oral antihistamines and oral steroids for severe cases.
- Treatment of large papillae – Cryo application, surgical excision or supratarsal application of long-acting steroids.
- General measures include use of dark goggles to prevent photophobia, cold compresses and ice pack for soothing effects, change of place from hot to cold areas.
- Desensitization has also been tried without much rewarding results.
- Treatment of vernal keratopathy – Punctuate epithelial keratitis require no extra treatment except that instillation of steroids should be increased. Large vernal plaque requires surgical excision. Ulcerative vernal keratitis require surgical treatment in the form of debridement, superficial keratectomy, excimer laser therapeutic keratectomy, as well as amniotic membrane transplantation to enhance re-epithelialisation.
- Recently treatment with tacrolimus ointment (0.1%) used topically twice daily is showing encouraging results.

== See also ==
- Conjunctivitis
- Allergic conjunctivitis
