= Toric Marker =

Marker for aligning toric intraoptical lens implants

Toric Markers are markers made for marking on the outside of the cornea or sclera part of the eye. They are designed with semi-sharp or pointed line or dot patterns.

There are two kinds of markers - Pre-Op markers and Intra-Op markers.

Pre-Op markers: these are used before the patient lies down for surgery. The marking is done when the patient is sitting up with eyes looking forward. The patterns are usually two lines that indicate one of the following

- Horizontal 0-180 lines for a pre-op marker
- Rotatable head - with two lines that are in the same line on the opposite sides of the circle
- Dot patterns - indicating opposite sides of the circle, on the same line, for a horizontal 0-180

Intra-Op markers: these are used during surgery, with the patient lying down on the surgery table, and doctor operating with a microscope. In a few cases, the markers are used during the surgery, along with a degree gauge.

- Two straight lines - with two lines that are in the same line on the opposite sides of the circle; designed to work with a degree gauge
- Dot patterns - indicating opposite sides of the circle, on the same line, for a horizontal 0-180
