= Scleral tattooing =

Tattooing the white part of a human eye

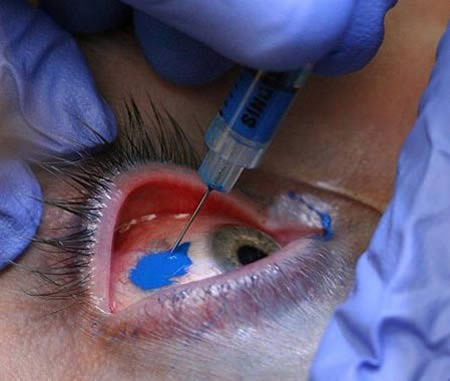
Scleral tattooing

Scleral tattooing is the practice of tattooing the sclera, or white part, of the human eye. Rather than being injected into the tissue, the dye is injected between two layers of the eye, then gradually spreads. The process remains uncommon due to professionals' discomfort performing the procedure and is illegal in the American states Oklahoma and Indiana and the Canadian provinces Ontario and Saskatchewan.

== History and practice ==
There are occasional reports dating back to the 1940s which suggest tattooing the scelera with small dots as part of experimental protocols seeking to determine how the human eye moves. There is, however, no documented history of scelera tattooing for medical or cosmetic purposes prior to the early 21st century. In around 2003, writer and artist Shannon Larratt photoshopped his eyes in a photo to look like the blue eyes of the Fremen in Frank Herbert's novel Dune. Inspired by his then-wife's eye implant surgery, he reached out to Howie "Luna Cobra" Rollins to devise a method to color his eyes permanently blue. Cobra agreed to attempt the procedure if Larratt could find two other volunteers. Larratt succeeded and carried out the process in 2007. As of March 2013, both Larratt and his volunteer Joshua Matthew Rahn have died of causes unrelated to the procedure (tubular aggregate myopathy and murder, respectively). Farrah Flawless, the other volunteer, has now had scleral tattoos for longer than anyone else in the world.

=== Procedure ===
Cobra initially attempted a procedure that involved covering the needle with ink and then puncturing the eye but deemed it unsuccessful. The technique he used during the procedure, injecting the sclera with blue dye, is similar to an established method practiced by surgeons who install eye implants. Larratt's wife Rachel underwent a procedure where the surgeon injected small drops of saline to create a fluid-filled pocket between the conjunctiva and the sclera, where he inserted a thin piece of platinum jewelry. The saline eventually dissipated and left only the jewelry behind. Larratt called Cobra's procedure "effectively painless because there aren't nerve endings in the surface of the eye" and claimed that the after-effects included minor pain, bruising, discomfort, and mild blistering between the sclera and conjunctiva.

In a 2007 Body Modification Ezine article, Larratt discussed the risks and possible complications of the procedure, including blindness, and said it should never be performed without a professional. He also stressed that scleral tattooing is still a new body modification and potential long-term effects have not yet been measured.

=== Complications and notable cases ===
Scleral tattooing has been associated with significant medical complications, including pain, chronic inflammation, infection, impaired vision and permanent blindness. Several cases have been widely reported in the media, drawing attention to the potential dangers of the procedure.

One of the most publicised incidents involved Catt Gallinger, a Canadian woman who underwent a scleral tattoo in 2017. Shortly after the procedure, she experienced severe swelling, discharge and long-term damage to the surface of the eye. Her case received international coverage and prompted renewed discussion among medical professionals regarding the safety and regulation of scleral tattooing.

A similar case occurred in the United Kingdom with Anaya-Nicole Parke-Peterson, who underwent an eyeball tattoo that led to serious complications and partial loss of vision. Her experience was featured in multiple national news outlets, where she described ongoing pain, reduced eyesight and the long-term impact on her daily life. Parke-Peterson later participated in follow-up interviews discussing the medical treatment she required and the risks associated with cosmetic eye modification.

Both cases have been cited by ophthalmologists and public health commentators as evidence of the need for clearer regulation, practitioner training standards and greater public awareness regarding the dangers associated with scleral tattooing.

== Legislation ==
In 2009, the Oklahoma Senate passed Bill 844, filed by Senator Cliff Branan, to make scleral tattooing illegal. This bill was supported by the Oklahoma Academy of Ophthalmology. In 2018, Indiana became the second state to outlaw this procedure; a $10,000 fine was set for violators. In Canada, Ontario (February 2017) and Saskatchewan (January 2020) have banned both scleral tattooing and the implantation of eye jewelry under the conjunctiva.

== See also ==
- Corneal tattooing
