= Lamina cribrosa sclerae =

Details

Identifiers
- Latin: lamina cribrosa sclerae
- TA98: A15.2.02.011
- FMA: 58371

The nerve fibers forming the optic nerve exit the eye posteriorly through a hole in the sclera that is occupied by a mesh-like structure called the lamina cribrosa. It is formed by a multilayered network of collagen fibers that extend from the scleral canal wall. The nerve fibers that comprise the optic nerve run through pores formed by these collagen beams. In humans, a central retinal artery is located slightly off-center in the nasal direction.

The lamina cribrosa is thought to help support the retinal ganglion cell axons as they traverse the scleral canal. Being structurally weaker than the much thicker and denser sclera, the lamina cribrosa is more sensitive to changes in the intraocular pressure and tends to react to increased pressure through posterior displacement. This is thought to be one of the causes of nerve damage in glaucoma, as the displacement of the lamina cribrosa causes the pores to deform and pinch the traversing nerve fibers and blood vessels.
