= Cooperative eye hypothesis =

Theory for the human eye's appearance

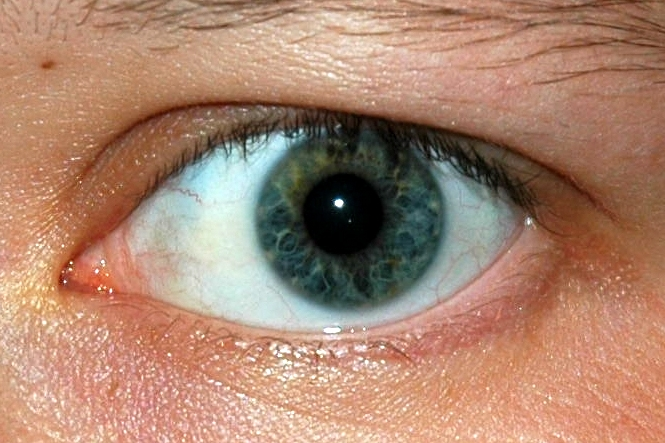
Human eye

The cooperative eye hypothesis is a proposed explanation for the appearance of the human eye. It suggests that the eye's distinctive visible characteristics evolved to make it easier for humans to follow another's gaze while communicating or while working together on tasks.

== Differences in primate eyes ==
Unlike other primates, humans have eyes with a distinct colour contrast between the white sclera, the coloured iris, and the black pupil. This is due to a lack of pigment in the sclera. Other primates mostly have pigmented sclerae that are brown or dark in colour. There is also a higher contrast between human skin, sclera, and irises. Human eyes are also larger in proportion to body size, and are longer horizontally. Among primates, humans are the only species where the outline of the eye and the position of the iris can be clearly seen in each individual.

== Studies ==
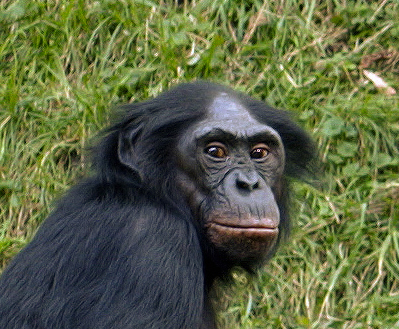
Bonobo with dark sclera

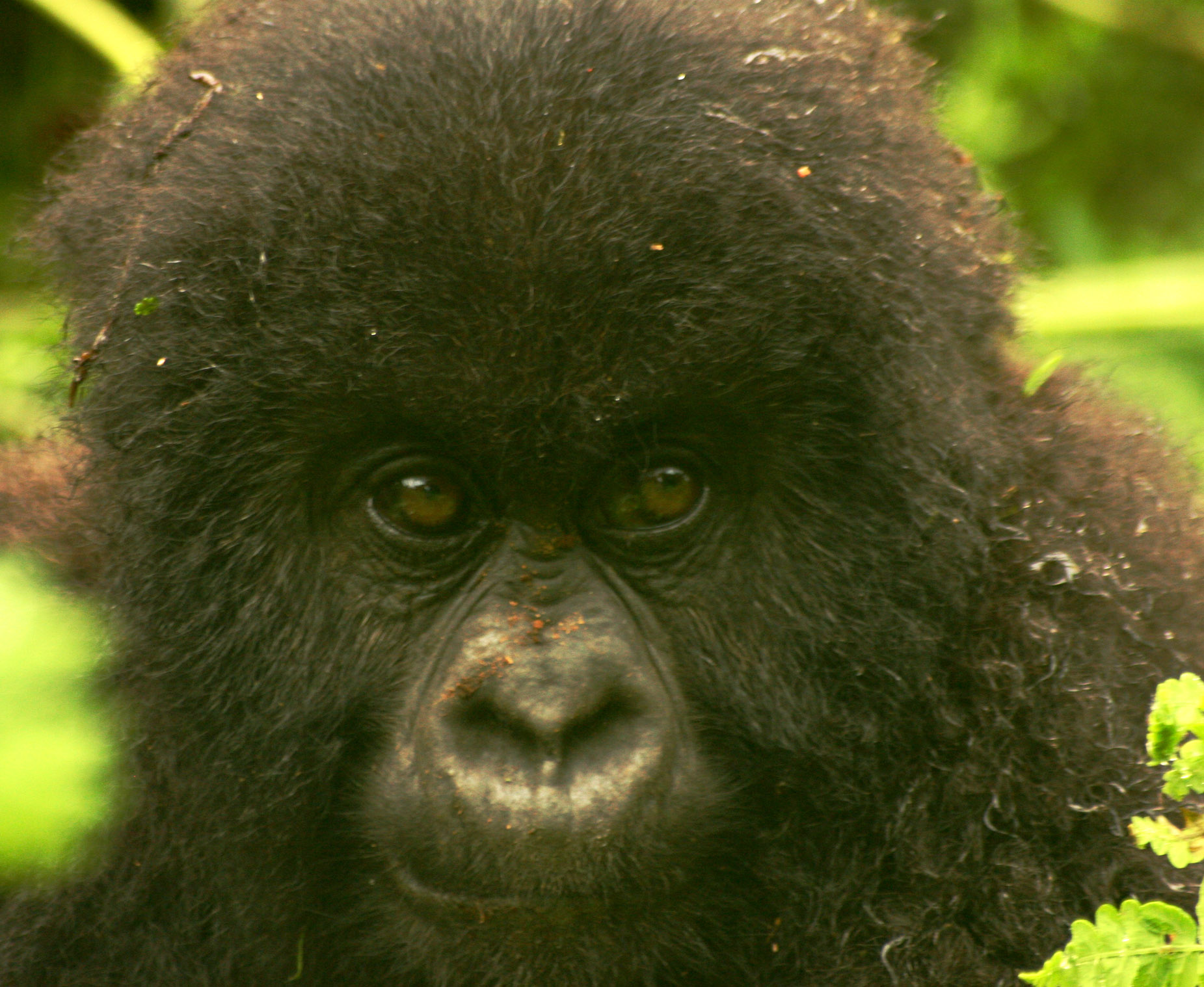
Gorilla eyes

The cooperative eye hypothesis was first proposed Michael Tomasello and colleagues in 2007, on the basis of a study by H. Kobayashi and S. Kohshima in 2001. The main tenets of the hypothesis are laid out in an earlier article, but this is not cited in Tomasello and colleagues' 2007 study. It is therefore unclear whether the cooperative eye hypothesis builds directly on Kobayashi & Kohshima's data, or whether it is based on Emery's 2000 article.

The cooperative eye hypothesis was tested by Michael Tomasello and others at the Max Planck Institute for Evolutionary Anthropology in Germany. Researchers examined the effect of head and eye movement on changing gaze direction in humans and other great apes. A human experimenter, observed by either a human infant, a gorilla, a bonobo, or a chimpanzee, did one of four actions:

- Tilted his head up while closing his eyes
- Looked at the ceiling with his eyes while keeping his head stationary
- Looked at the ceiling with his head and his eyes
- Looked straight ahead without moving his head or his eyes

The apes were most likely to follow the gaze of the experimenter when only his head moved. The infants followed the gaze more often when only the eyes moved.

The results suggest that humans depend more on eye movements than head movements when trying to follow the gaze of another. Anthropologists not involved in the study have called the hypothesis plausible, noting that "human infants and children both infer cooperative intentions in others and display cooperative intentions themselves."

== Evolutionary cause ==
Studies of great ape behavior show that they are good at cooperating in situations where there is no potential of deception, but behave egotistically in situations where there are motives for deception, suggesting that their "lack of cooperativeness" is not a lack of a cognitive ability at all, but rather a necessary adaptation to a society full of deception. This suggests that human cooperativeness began when proto-humans began to successfully avoid competition, which is also supported by the fact that the oldest evidence of care for the long-term sick and disabled are from shortly after the first emigration of hominins out of Africa about 1.8 million years ago.

== Other hypotheses ==
The cooperative eye hypothesis is not the only one that has been proposed to explain the appearance of the human eye. Other hypotheses include the proposal that white sclerae are a sign of good health, useful in mate selection, or that eye visibility promotes altruistic behaviour by letting people know they are being watched. A study by the Max Planck Institute for Evolutionary Anthropology noted that "these hypotheses are not mutually exclusive, and highly visible eyes may serve all of these functions."

The cooperative eye hypothesis has been questioned based on examinations of the correspondence between known eye-gaze following behaviors and patterns of (de)pigmentation leading to conspicuous eye appearances in hominoids.

== See also ==
- Joint attention
- Stare-in-the-crowd effect
- Theory of mind
