= Local blood flow regulation =

Control of blood flow within tissues, organs, or organ systems

In physiology, acute local blood flow regulation refers to an intrinsic regulation, or control, of the vascular tone of arteries at a local level, meaning within a certain tissue type, organ, or organ system. This intrinsic type of control means that the blood vessels can automatically adjust their own vascular tone, by dilating (widening) or constricting (narrowing), in response to some change in the environment. This change occurs in order to match up the tissue's oxygen demand with the actual oxygen supply available in the blood as closely as possible. For example, if a muscle is being utilized actively, it will require more oxygen than it was at rest, so the blood vessels supplying that muscle will vasodilate, or widen in size, to increase the amount of blood, and therefore oxygen, being delivered to that muscle.

There are several mechanisms by which vascular tone, and therefore blood flow, is controlled. The sympathetic nervous system and a variety of hormones, for instance, both exert some degree of control over vascular tone. However, the local intrinsic regulatory system described here is completely independent of these other mechanisms. Many organs or organ systems have their own unique mechanism of local blood flow regulation, as explained below.

== Individual Mechanisms ==
There are two major means of local regulation of blood flow, which are described below.

1. Metabolic control, which consists of metabolites and paracrine agents released from surrounding tissue that act on the blood vessel(s). For example, as tissue metabolism increases, driving up oxygen demand, the amount of available oxygen decreases, driving down the pH and triggering a release in adenosine, which triggers the blood vessel to vasodilate.
2. Myogenic control, which originates from the wall of the blood vessel itself and consists of both muscle reflexes and products released from endothelial cells that line the vessel. These endothelial products include nitric oxide and endothelin-1 that are released in response to either chemical stimuli, like histamine, or increased shear stress on the blood vessel (meaning the amount of stress exerted by blood on the blood vessel walls). While nitric oxide causes vasodilation, endothelin-1 causes vasoconstriction.

== Examples of local blood flow regulation ==
Below are several examples of differing types of local blood flow regulation by specific organ type or organ system. In each case, there is a specific type of intrinsic regulation occurring in order to maintain or alter blood flow to that given organ alone, instead of creating a systemic change that would affect the entire body.

- Cerebral (brain) circulation is highly sensitive to changes in pCO_{2}, meaning the amount of dissolved carbon dioxide (CO_{2}) present in the blood vessel, as well as the hydrogen ion concentration. Both of these factors affect pH and, in turn, the balance between vasodilation versus vasoconstriction in the brain. So, the blood vessels found specifically in the brain respond changes in dissolved carbon dioxide levels.
- Coronary (heart) circulation is controlled at the local level primarily by metabolic control mechanism. More specifically it is regulated by adenosine, a local vasodilator produced by neighboring cells. Therefore, the heart is influenced by a form of metabolic control through the effects of paracrine signaling.
- Renal (kidney) circulation is primarily controlled by Tubuloglomerular Feedback, which is a system of organ-specific autoregulation that directly affects renal blood flow.
- Pulmonary (lung) circulation undergoes hypoxic vasoconstriction, which is a unique mechanism of local regulation in that the blood vessels in this organ react to hypoxemia, or low levels of dissolved oxygen in blood, in the opposite way as the rest of the body. While tissues and organs tend to increase blood flow by vasodilating in response to low oxygen supply, the blood vessels in the lungs actually vasoconstrict to decrease blood flow in response to low oxygen.
- Splanchnic circulation, which supplies blood to several gastrointestinal organs (liver, gallbladder, pancreas, intestines) and the spleen, is influenced by gastrointestinal hormones and metabolites, such as vasodilatory kinins, released from the cells lining the intestines, bile acids from the gallbladder, and by products of digestion. This is an example of control at the organ system level as this group of organs all receive blood flow from one central source, the splanchnic artery.
- Skeletal muscle is influenced by multiple factors. First, metabolites that are produced by active muscle use can alter skeletal muscle tone. Second, skeletal muscle can undergo hyperemia, which is a mechanism of local blood flow regulation with two major subtypes. Regardless of the subtype, the result of hyperemia is an increase in blood flow to the affected skeletal muscle.
  - Active hyperemia is one subtype, which occurs in response to increased metabolic demand, meaning high oxygen requirements within the tissue. It follows the principle of metabolic control, with the release of vasodilatory substances in response to increased oxygen demand. This is classically seen in skeletal muscle in activities like running where muscles are activity being utilized and thus have increased oxygen demand.
  - Reactive hyperemia is the second subtype, which occurs after a short interruption, or arrest, in blood flow. In response to the blood flow interruption, a temporary compensatory vasodilation occurs as soon as blood flow has resumed, before returning to normal. This response occurs because vasodilatory substances, like adenosine, are released in response to the blood flow interruption, meaning that when blood flow resumes it occurs in a wider blood vessel and thus at an increased flow rate. This is classically seen in weight lifting, as skeletal muscle can become occluded momentarily during this activity, thus suspending blood flow.

== See also ==
- Vasodilation
- Vasoconstriction
- Vascular resistance
