= Episcleritis =

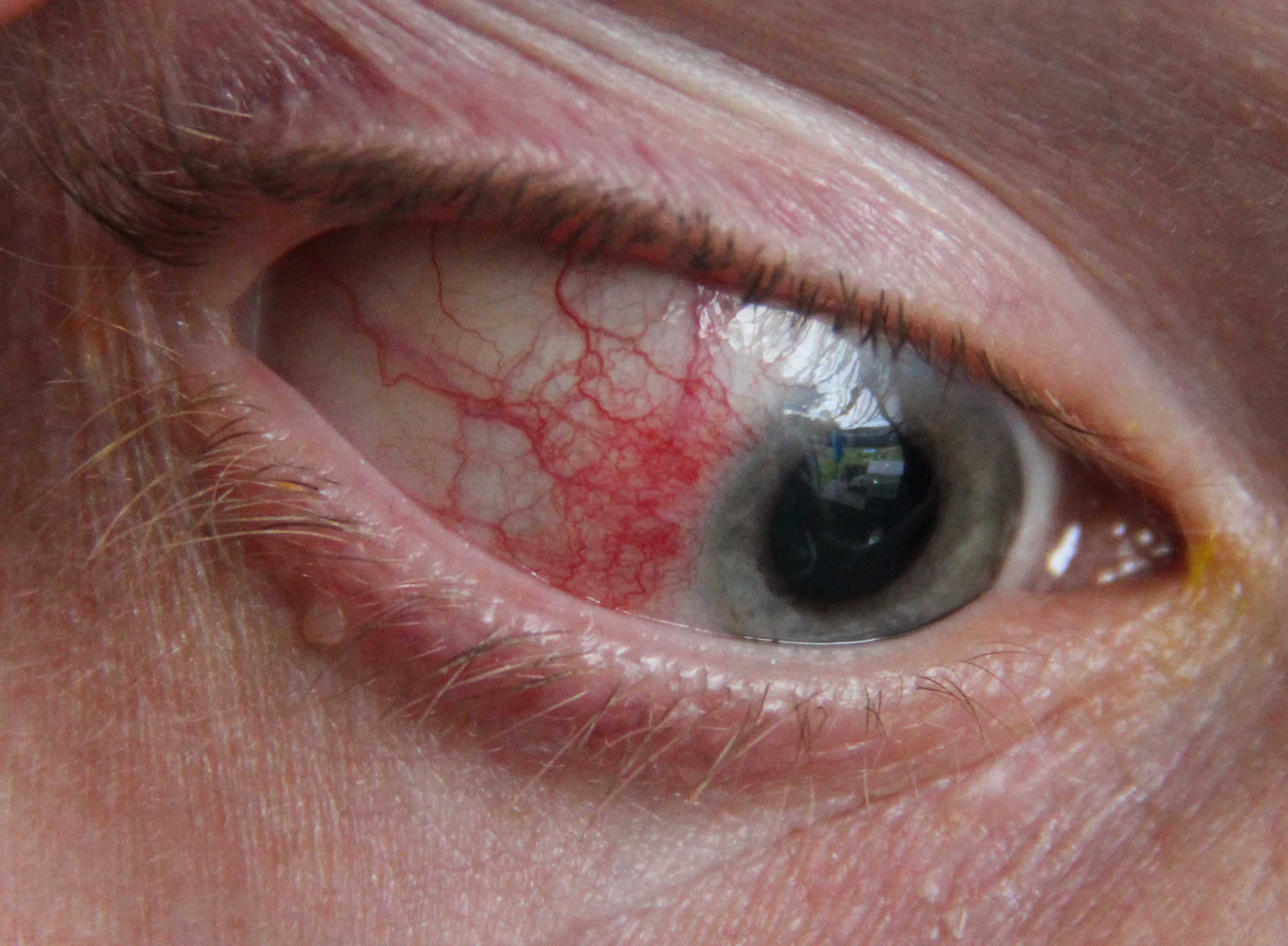
- Eye with Episcleritis
- Specialty: Ophthalmology
- Symptoms: Photophobia, hot/prickly/gritty sensation in eye, Eye redness without pain, Watery eyes
- Types: Nodular and simple/diffuse
- Diagnostic method: History and physical examination
- Differential diagnosis: Scleritis, Pinguecula
- Treatment: Artificial tears, supportive care
- Medication: Topical corticosteroids Non-steroidal anti-inflammatory drugs.
- Prognosis: Good

Episcleritis is a benign, self-limiting inflammatory disease affecting part of the eye called the episclera. The episclera is a thin layer of tissue that lies between the conjunctiva and the connective tissue layer that forms the white of the eye (sclera). Episcleritis is a common condition, and is characterized by the abrupt onset of painless eye redness.

There are two types of episcleritis, nodular and simple. Nodular episcleritis lesions have raised surface. Simple episcleritis lesions are flat. There are two subtypes. In diffuse simple episcleritis, inflammation is generalized. In sectoral simple episcleritis, the inflammation is restricted to one region.

Most cases of episcleritis have no identifiable cause, although about a third of cases are associated with various systemic diseases. Often people with episcleritis experience it recurrently. Treatment focuses on decreasing discomfort, and includes lubricating eye drops. More severe cases may be treated with topical corticosteroids or oral anti-inflammatory medications (NSAIDs).

== Signs and symptoms ==
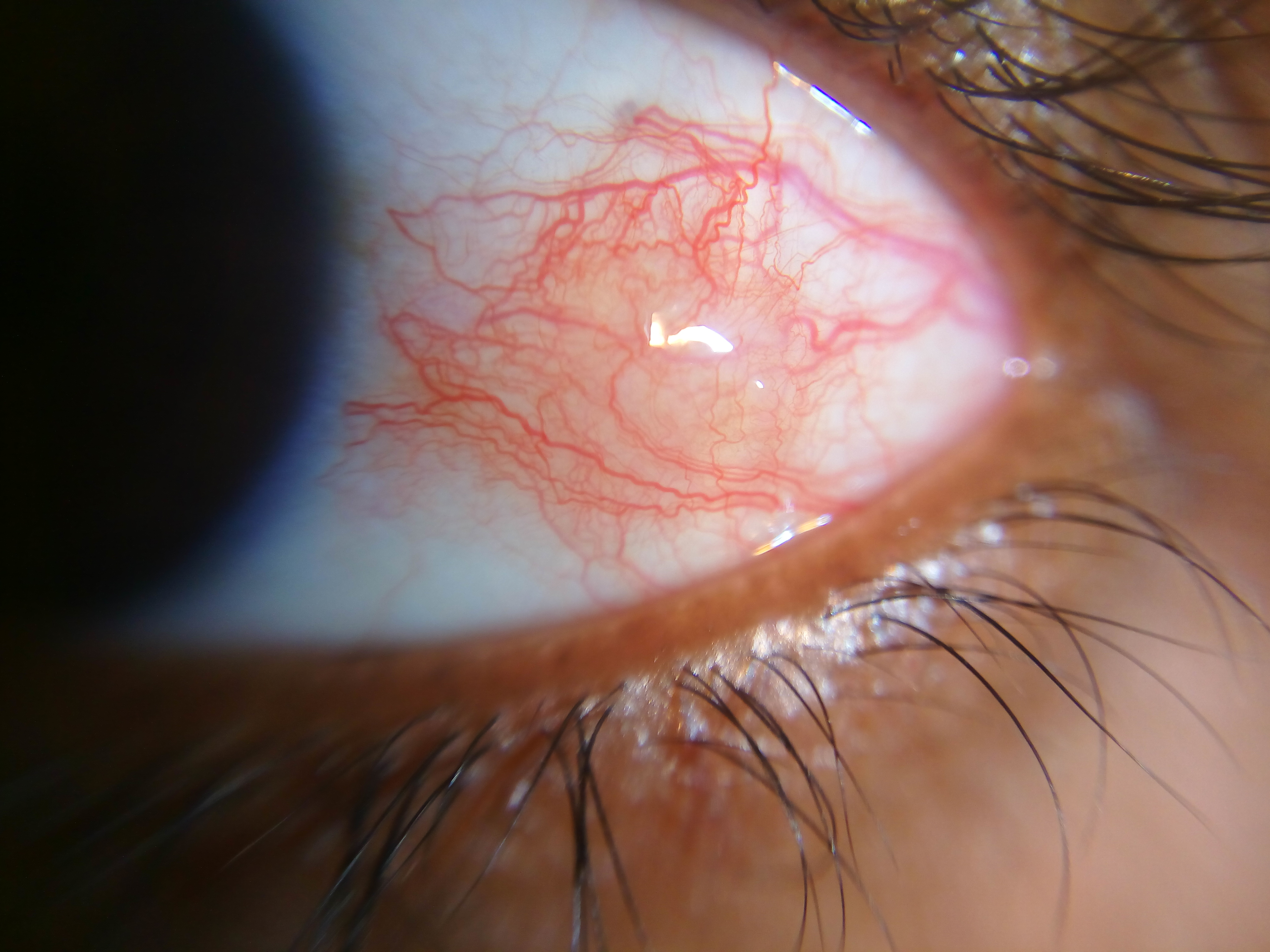
Episcleritis of a 40 year old female

Symptoms of episcleritis typically include painless redness of the eye (mild pain is possible but atypical), and watery eyes. The pain of episcleritis is typically mild, less severe than in scleritis, and may be tender to palpation.

There are two types of episcleritis: the diffuse type, where the redness involves the entire episclera, and the nodular type, where the redness appears more nodular, involving only a small, well-circumscribed area (sectoral). The diffuse type of episcleritis may be less painful than the nodular type. Sometimes, small nodules are present within the episclera, which move slightly over the sclera with gentle pressure.

Discharge is absent with episcleritis, and vision is unaffected. Patients with episcleritis experience far less photophobia than patients with uveitis. Episcleritis does not cause the presence of cells or flare in the anterior chamber of the eye. In 80 percent of cases, episcleritis affects only one eye, whereas scleritis often affects both eyes.

== Pathophysiology ==
Episcleritis is caused by inflammation due to the activation of immune cells, including lymphocytes and macrophages. In most cases, the cause of episcleritis is never determined (idiopathic). An identifiable cause is discovered in about one third of cases. Several diseases are associated with episcleritis, including systemic vasculitis (polyarteritis nodosa, granulomatosis with polyangiitis, Behçet's disease), connective tissue diseases (rheumatoid arthritis, relapsing polychondritis, systemic lupus erythematosus), psoriatic arthritis, ankylosing spondylitis, Cogan syndrome, rosacea, gout, atopy, Crohn's disease, and ulcerative colitis. 59 percent of patients with relapsing polychondritis have either episcleritis or scleritis. Rarely, episcleritis may be caused by scleritis. Very rarely, episcleritis is associated with infections, including Lyme disease, tuberculosis, syphilis, and herpes zoster.

The redness in the eye associated with episcleritis is due to engorgement of the large episcleral blood vessels, which run in a radial direction from the limbus. Typically, there is no uveitis, or thickening of the sclera.

== Diagnosis ==
The diagnosis of episcleritis is based upon the history and physical examination. The history should be explored for the presence of the diseases associated with episcleritis, and the symptoms they cause, such as rash, arthritis, venereal disease, and recent viral infection. Episcleritis may be differentiated from scleritis by using phenylephrine or neosynephrine eye drops, which causes blanching of the blood vessels in episcleritis, but not in scleritis. A blue color to the sclera suggests scleritis, rather than episcleritis. After anesthetizing the eye with medication, the conjunctiva may be moved with a cotton swab to observe the location of the enlarged blood vessels. In very rare cases, if episcleritis does not respond to treatment, then a biopsy may be considered, which help provide information regarding any underlying condition (granulomatosis with polyangitis, vasculitis, etc.). However, a biopsy is not routinely necessary in the diagnosis of episcleritis.

== Treatment ==
Often, treatment is not necessary, because episcleritis is a self-limiting condition. Artificial tears may be used to help with irritation and discomfort. More severe cases can be treated with either topical corticosteroids or oral non-steroidal anti-inflammatory drugs.

Ketorolac, a topical NSAID, may be used, but it is not more effective than artificial tears and it causes more side effects.

== Prognosis ==
Episcleritis is a benign, self-limiting condition, meaning patients recover without any treatment. Most cases of episcleritis resolve within 7–10 days. The nodular type is more aggressive and takes longer to resolve. Although rare, some cases may progress to scleritis. However, in general, episcleritis does not cause complications in the eye. Smoking tobacco delays the response to treatment in patients with episcleritis.

== Epidemiology ==
While episcleritis is a common disease, its exact prevalence and incidence are unknown. It typically affects young or middle aged women. The diffuse form of episcleritis (70%) is more common than the nodular form (30%). One retrospective study found 28 percent of individuals with episcleritis experienced recurrent episodes of the disease.
