= Superficial keratectomy =

Ophthalmic surgical procedure

Superficial keratectomy (SK), also known as "Super K" or "corneal epithelial debridement", is an ophthalmic surgical procedure takes place on the surface of the cornea to remove irregularities or scars.

SK involves removing the epithelial layer of the cornea leaving the bowman's membrane undisturbed. Often, the bowman's layer is polished and smoothed with a diamond tip burr or laser which encourages anchoring of the new epithelium as it grows back. Many doctors will use the antibiotic Mitomycin or an amniotic membrane transplant to improve surgical outcomes.

It is often performed prior to cataract surgery if evaluation of the patient reveals scarring. While indicated for primary corneal surface pathologies, superficial keratectomy may also be performed to clear the visual axis or improve diagnostic accuracy prior to intraocular procedures, such as cataract surgery.

The diagram shows all parts of the eye, with a detailed view of the cornea and its layers.

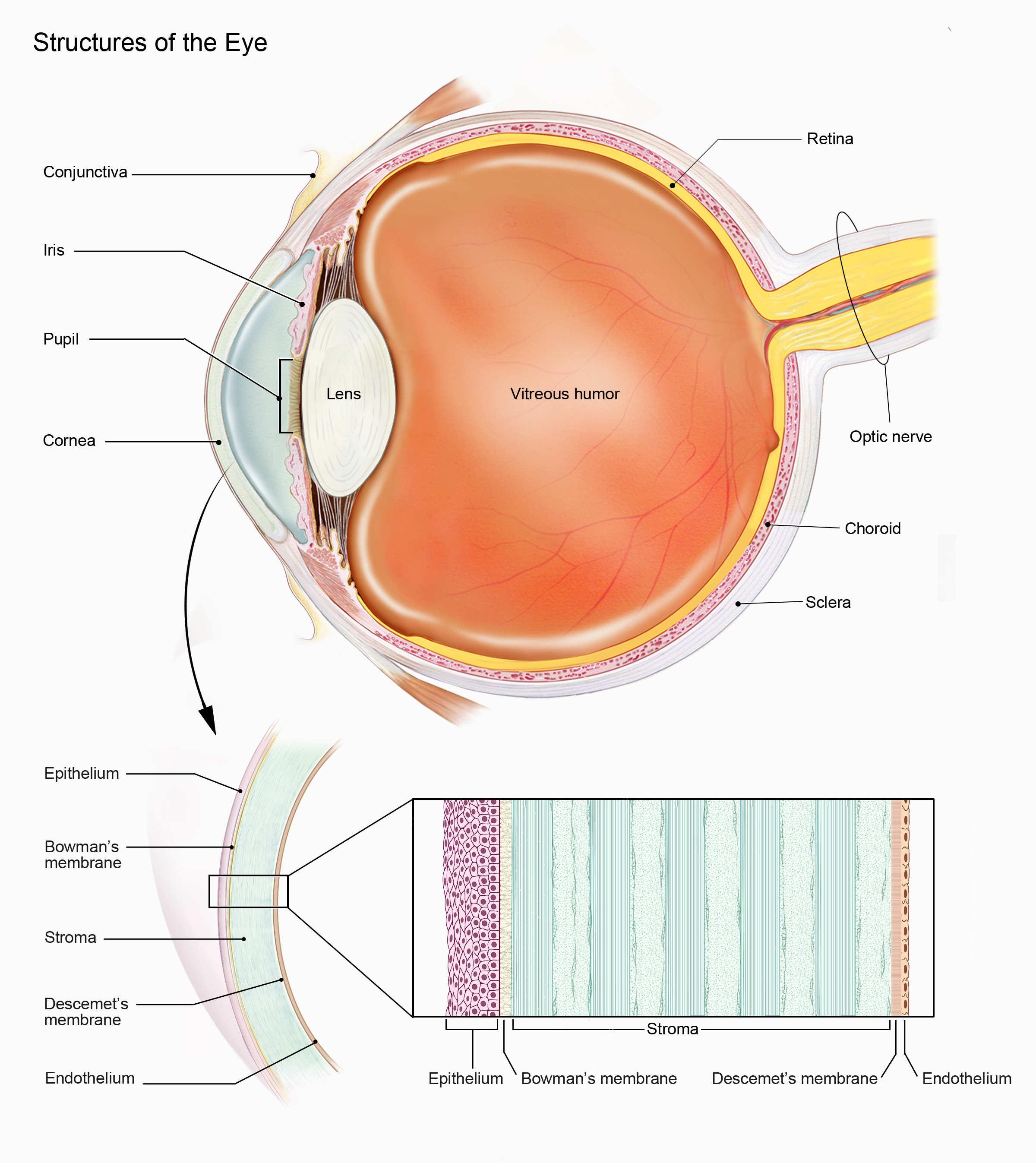
Components of the cornea

== Common conditions that require SK ==
- Preparatory to some types of Cataract surgery
- Epithelial Basement Membrane Dystrophy
- Recurrent Corneal Erosion Syndrome
- Salzmann's Nodular degeneration (corneal superficial nodules)
- Removal of Band Keratopathy (Calcium Deposits)
- Superficial corneal scar

== Complications ==
There are a few risks to consider before performing or receiving SK. Although SK is considered a low risk procedure, some patients will experience complications such as:

- infection of the cornea
- corneal haze
- delayed or failed epithelial healing
- corneal erosion
