= Corneal ulcer =

Epithelial disruption of the cornea of the eye due to trauma or infection

- Other names: Ulcerative keratitis
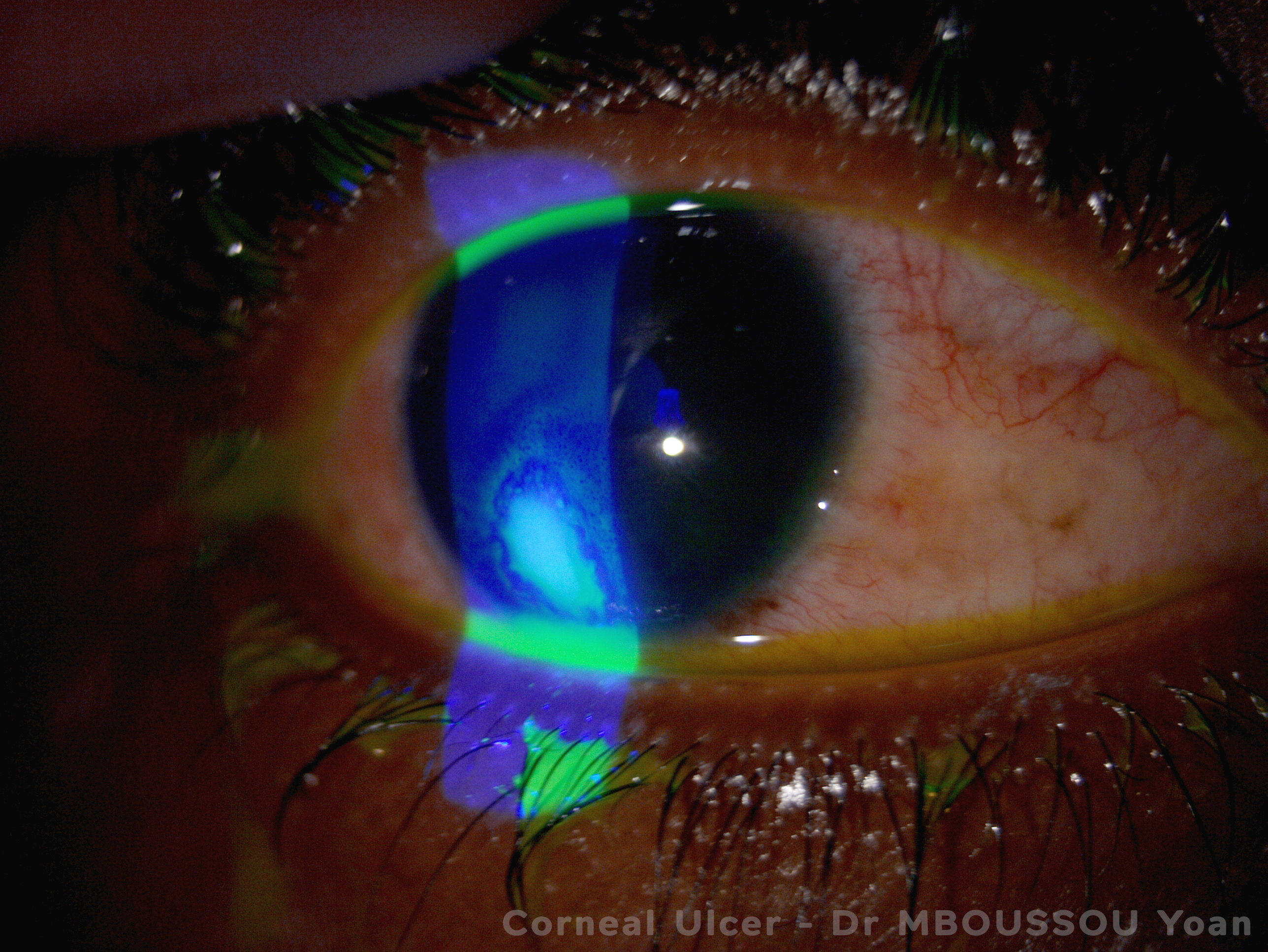
- Corneal ulcer resulting from bacterial keratitis
- Specialty: Ophthalmology
- Symptoms: Pain, photophobia, blurry vision
- Complications: Scarring, vision loss, uveitis, glaucoma, cataract formation
- Causes: Bacterial, fungal, viral, or protozoal infection; immune disorders (rheumatoid arthritis, systemic sclerosis [scleroderma], rosacea)
- Prevention: Proper contact lens hygiene
- Treatment: Antibiotic, antifungal or antiviral eye drops
- Prognosis: Good with prompt treatment

Corneal ulcer, often resulting from keratitis is an inflammatory or, more seriously, infective condition of the cornea involving disruption of its epithelial layer with involvement of the corneal stroma. It is a common condition in humans particularly in the tropics and in farming. In developing countries, children afflicted by vitamin A deficiency are at high risk for corneal ulcer and may become blind in both eyes persisting throughout life. In ophthalmology, a corneal ulcer usually refers to having an infection, while the term corneal abrasion refers more to a scratch injury.

== Types ==
=== Superficial and deep corneal ulcers ===
Corneal ulcers are a common human eye disease. They are caused by trauma, particularly with vegetable matter, as well as chemical injury, contact lenses and infections. Other eye conditions can cause corneal ulcers, such as entropion, distichiasis, corneal dystrophy, and keratoconjunctivitis sicca (dry eye).

Many micro-organisms cause infective corneal ulcer. Among them are bacteria (including Chlamydia trachomatis), fungi, viruses, and protozoa:

- Bacterial keratitis is caused by Staphylococcus aureus, Streptococcus viridans, Escherichia coli, Enterococci, Pseudomonas, Nocardia, N. gonorrhoea and Chlamydia trachomatis as well as many other bacteria.
- Fungal keratitis causes deep and severe corneal ulcer. It is caused by Aspergillus sp., Fusarium sp., Candida sp., and also Rhizopus, Mucor, and other fungi. The typical feature of fungal keratitis is slow onset and gradual progression, where signs are much more than the symptoms. Small satellite lesions around the ulcer are a common feature of fungal keratitis and hypopyon is usually seen.
- Viral keratitis causes corneal ulceration. It is caused most commonly by herpes simplex, herpes zoster and adenoviruses. It can also be caused by coronaviruses and many other viruses. Herpes virus cause a dendritic ulcer, which can recur and relapse over the lifetime of an individual.
- Protozoa infection such as Acanthamoeba keratitis is characterized by severe pain and is associated with contact lens users swimming in pools.

Superficial ulcers involve a loss of part of the epithelium. Deep ulcers extend into or through the stroma and can result in severe scarring and corneal perforation. Descemetoceles occur when the ulcer extends through the stroma. This type of ulcer is especially dangerous and can rapidly result in corneal perforation if not treated in time.

The location of the ulcer depends somewhat on the cause. Central ulcers are typically caused by trauma, dry eye or exposure from facial nerve paralysis or exophthalmos. Entropion, severe dry eye and trichiasis (inturning of eyelashes) may cause ulceration of the peripheral cornea. Immune-mediated eye disease can cause ulcers at the border of the cornea and sclera. These include Rheumatoid arthritis, rosacea, systemic sclerosis which lead to a special type of corneal ulcer called Mooren's ulcer. It has a circumferential crater-like depression of the cornea, just inside the limbus, usually with an overhanging edge.

== Refractory corneal ulcers ==
Refractory corneal ulcers are superficial ulcers that heal poorly and tend to recur. They are also known as indolent ulcers or Boxer ulcers. They are believed to be caused by a defect in the basement membrane and a lack of hemidesmosomal attachments. They are recognized by undermined epithelium that surrounds the ulcer and easily peels back. Refractory corneal ulcers are most commonly seen in diabetics and often occur in the other eye later. They are similar to Cogan's cystic dystrophy.

=== Melting ulcers ===
Melting ulcers are a type of corneal ulcer involving progressive loss of stroma in a dissolving fashion. This is most commonly seen in Pseudomonas infection, but it can be caused by other types of bacteria or fungi. These infectious agents produce proteases and collagenases which break down the corneal stroma. Complete loss of the stroma can occur within 24 hours. Treatment includes antibiotics and collagenase inhibitors such as acetylcysteine. Surgery in the form of corneal transplantation (penetrating keratoplasty) is usually necessary to save the eye.

== Signs and symptoms ==
Corneal ulcers are painful due to nerve exposure, and can cause tearing, squinting, and vision loss of the eye. There may also be signs of anterior uveitis, such as miosis (small pupil), aqueous flare (protein in the aqueous humour), and redness of the eye. An axon reflex may be responsible for uveitis formation—stimulation of pain receptors in the cornea results in release inflammatory mediators such as prostaglandins, histamine, and acetylcholine.

Sensitivity to light (photophobia) is also a common symptom of corneal ulcer. Redness of the affected eye is common. Brow ache and head ache may be present. Drooping of eyelid may be present. Slit lamp examination shows loss of epithelium. The site of the ulcer is studied and marked in case sheet. The edge of the ulcer is studied. Whether satellite lesion is present or not is seen. Next, the cornea is stained with 1% fluorescein, with the ulcer staining green.

== Corneal healing ==
An ulcer of the cornea heals by two methods: migration of surrounding epithelial cells followed by mitosis (dividing) of the cells, and introduction of blood vessels from the conjunctiva. Superficial small ulcers heal rapidly by the first method. However, larger or deeper ulcers often require the presence of blood vessels to supply inflammatory cells. White blood cells and fibroblasts produce granulation tissue and then scar tissue, effectively healing the cornea.

== Diagnosis ==
Diagnosis is done by direct observation under magnified view of slit lamp revealing the ulcer on the cornea. The use of fluorescein stain, which is taken up by exposed corneal stroma and appears green, helps in defining the margins of the corneal ulcer, and can reveal additional details of the surrounding epithelium. Herpes simplex ulcers show a typical dendritic pattern of staining. Rose-Bengal dye is also used for supra-vital staining purposes, but it may be very irritating to the eyes. In descemetoceles, the Descemet's membrane will bulge forward and after staining will appear as a dark circle with a green boundary, because it does not absorb the stain. Doing a corneal scraping and examining under the microscope with stains like Gram's and KOH preparation may reveal the bacteria and fungi respectively. Microbiological culture tests may be necessary to isolate the causative organisms for some cases. Other tests that may be necessary include a Schirmer's test for keratoconjunctivitis sicca and an analysis of facial nerve function for facial nerve paralysis.

== Treatment ==
Proper diagnosis is essential for optimal treatment. The cause of the ulcer is to be decided, whether infective or non-infective. Bacterial corneal ulcers require intensive fortified antibiotic therapy to treat the infection. Fungal corneal ulcers require intensive application of topical anti-fungal agents. Viral corneal ulceration caused by herpes virus may respond to antivirals like topical acyclovir ointment instilled at least five times a day. Supportive therapy such as pain medications are given, including topical cycloplegics like atropine or homatropine to dilate the pupil and thereby stop spasms of the ciliary muscle. Superficial ulcers may heal in less than a week. Deep ulcers and descemetoceles may require conjunctival grafts or conjunctival flaps, soft contact lenses, or corneal transplant. Proper nutrition, including protein intake and vitamin C, are usually advised. In cases of keratomalacia, where the corneal ulceration is due to a deficiency of vitamin A, supplementation of vitamin A by oral or intramuscular route is given. Drugs that are usually contraindicated in corneal ulcer are topical corticosteroids and anesthetics—these should not be used on any type of corneal ulcer because they prevent healing, may lead to superinfection with fungi and other bacteria and will often make the condition much worse.

=== Refractory ulcers ===
Topical antibiotics are used at hourly intervals to treat infectious corneal ulcers. Cycloplegic eye drops are applied to give rest to the eye. Pain medications are given as needed. Loose epithelium and ulcer base can be scraped off and sent for culture sensitivity studies to find out the pathogenic organism. This helps in choosing appropriate antibiotics. Complete healing takes anywhere from about a few weeks to several months.

Refractory corneal ulcers can take a long time to heal, sometimes months. In case of progressive or non-healing ulcers, surgical intervention by an ophthalmologist with corneal transplantation may be required to save the eye. In all corneal ulcers it is important to rule out predisposing factors like diabetes mellitus and immunodeficiency. Conjunctival flap may be drawn over the ulcer as an alternative.

== See also ==
=== Seasonal corneal ulcer ===
- Christmas Eye, a seasonal epidemic of corneal ulceration which predominantly occurs only within a particular region of Australia
- Vernal keratoconjunctivitis, a recurrent, bilateral, and self-limiting inflammation of conjunctiva, having a periodic seasonal incidence: Grade 3
