= Epithelial basement membrane dystrophy =

Disorder of the cornea of the eye

- Other names: Map-dot-fingerprint dystrophy and Cogans's microcystic dystrophy or Cogan's dystrophy
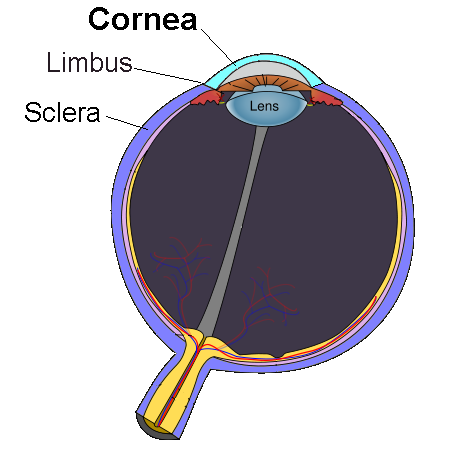
- A schematic diagram of the human eye
- Specialty: Ophthalmology
- Symptoms: Irregular astigmatism, misty vision, monocular diplopia and visual distortion
- Duration: Lifelong
- Risk factors: Recurrent corneal erosion, dry eyes
- Treatment: Surgical and non-surgical options available

Epithelial basement membrane dystrophy (EBMD) is a disorder of the eye that can cause pain and dryness. EBMD, also known as map-dot-fingerprint dystrophy and Cogan microcystic epithelial dystrophy, is a corneal epithelial disease that may result in recurrent corneal erosions, irregular corneal astigmatism, and decreased vision.

It is sometimes included in the group of corneal dystrophies. It diverges from the formal definition of corneal dystrophy since it is non-familial in most cases. It also has a fluctuating course, while for a typical corneal dystrophy the course is progressive. When it is considered part of this group, it is the most common type of corneal dystrophy.

== Signs and symptoms ==
Patients may complain of severe problems with dry eyes, or with visual obscurations. It can also be asymptomatic, and only discovered because of subtle lines and marks seen during an eye exam.

EBMD is a bilateral anterior corneal dystrophy characterized by grayish epithelial fingerprint lines, geographic map-like lines, and dots (or microcysts) on slit-lamp examination. Findings are variable and can change with time. While the disorder is usually asymptomatic, up to 10% of patients may have recurrent corneal erosions, usually beginning after age 30; conversely, 50% of patients presenting with idiopathic recurrent erosions have evidence of this dystrophy.

== Pathophysiology ==
According to research published in 2006, in some families autosomal dominant inheritance and point mutations in the transforming growth factor, beta-induced (TGFBI) gene encoding keratoepithelin have been identified, but according to the International Committee for Classification of Corneal Diseases (IC3D) the available data still does not merit a confident inclusion of EBMD in the group of corneal dystrophies. In view of this, the more accurate designation of the disease is possibly not dystrophy but corneal degeneration.

The main pathological feature of the disease is thickened, multilaminar and disfigured basement membrane of corneal epithelium. The change in the structure affects the epithelium, some cells of which may become entrapped in the rugged membrane and fail to migrate to the surface where they should undergo desquamation.

For patients with granular corneal dystrophy type 2 (GCD2) who have the TGFBI p.(R124H) mutation, complications have been observed following LASIK surgery.

== Treatment ==
Phototherapeutic keratectomy (PTK) done by an ophthalmologist can restore and preserve useful visual function for a significant period of time in patients with anterior corneal dystrophies including EBMD.

== See also ==
- Corneal dystrophy
