= Episcleral layer =

Outermost layer of the sclera

Details

Identifiers
- Latin: lamina episcleralis
- TA98: A15.2.02.008
- TA2: 6816
- FMA: 58362

The episclera is the outermost layer of the sclera (the white of the eye). It is composed of loose, fibrous, elastic tissue and attaches to Tenon's capsule.

A vascular plexus is found between the bulbar conjunctiva and the sclera consisting of two layers of vessels, the superficial episcleral vessels and the deep episcleral vessels.

== Clinical significance ==
In episcleritis, the episclera and Tenon's capsule are infiltrated with inflammatory cells.
