= Hyperaemia =

Increase in blood flow to certain tissues in the body

Hyperemia
- Other names: Hyperæmia, hyperemia
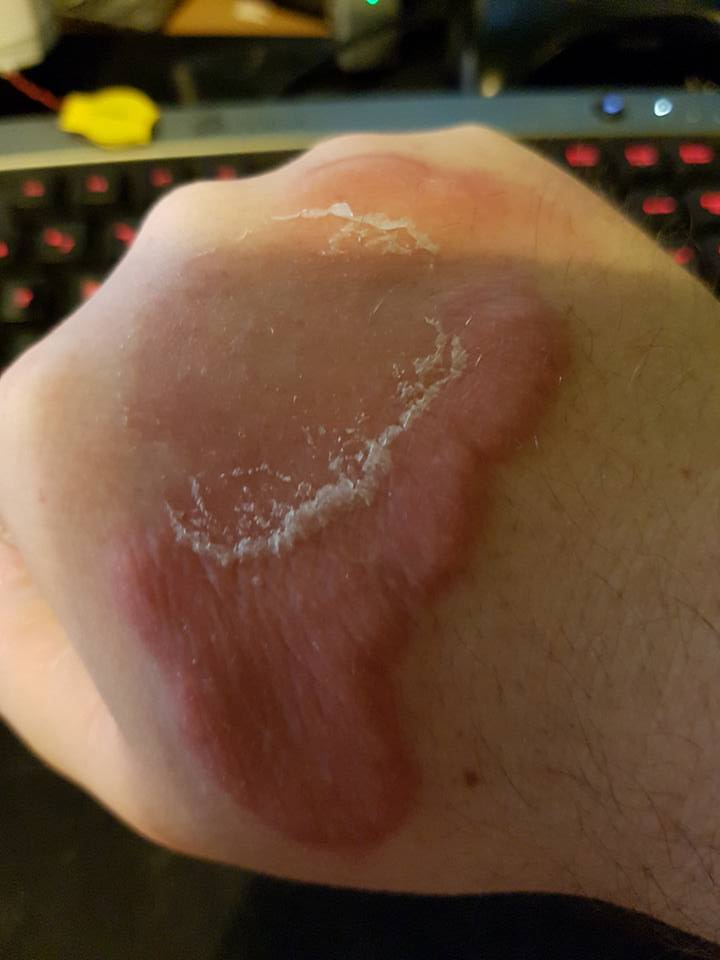
- Redness can be a symptom of hyperaemia.
- Symptoms: Increase of blood flow and erythema

Hyperaemia (also hyperemia) is the increase of blood flow to different tissues in the body. It can have medical implications but is also a regulatory response, allowing change in blood supply to different tissues through vasodilation (widening of blood vessels). Clinically, hyperaemia in tissues manifests as erythema (redness of the skin) because of the engorgement of vessels with oxygenated blood. Hyperaemia can also occur due to a fall in atmospheric pressure outside the body. The term comes from Greek ὑπέρ (hupér) 'over' and αἷμα (haîma) 'blood'.

== Regulation of blood flow ==
Functional hyperaemia is an increase in blood flow to a tissue due to the presence of metabolites and a change in general conditions. When a tissue increases its activity, there is a well-characterized fall in the partial pressure of oxygen and pH, along with an increase in partial pressure of carbon dioxide, and a rise in temperature and the concentration of potassium ions. The mechanisms of vasodilation are predominantly local metabolites and myogenic effects. Increased metabolic activity of the tissue leads to a local increase in the extracellular concentration of such chemicals as adenosine, carbon dioxide, and lactic acid, and a decrease in oxygen and pH. These changes cause significant vasodilation. The reverse occurs when metabolic activity is slowed and these substances wash out of the tissues. The myogenic effect refers to the inherent attempt of vascular smooth muscle surrounding arterioles and arteries to maintain the tension in the wall of these blood vessels by dilating when internal pressure is reduced and to constrict when wall tension increases.

== Functional hyperaemia ==
Functional hyperaemia, metabolic hyperaemia, arterial hyperaemia or active hyperaemia, is the increased blood flow that occurs when tissue is active.

Hyperaemia is likely mediated by the increased synthesis and/or release of vasodilatory agents during periods of heightened cellular metabolism. The increase in cellular metabolism causes the increase in vasoactive metabolic byproducts. Some of the putative vasodilatory agents (associated with metabolism) include, but are not limited to: carbon dioxide (CO_{2}), hydrogen ion (H^{+}), potassium (K^{+}), adenosine (ADO), nitric oxide (NO)). These vasodilators released from the tissue act on local arterioles causing vasodilation, this causes a decrease in vascular resistance and allows an increase in blood flow to be directed toward the capillary bed of the active tissue. This increase allows the blood to serve the increased metabolic demand of the tissue and prevents a mismatch between O_{2}-demand O_{2}-supply. Recent research has suggested that the locally produced vasodilators may be acting in a redundant manner, in which the antagonism of one dilator, (be it pharmacologically or pathologically), may be compensated for by another in order to preserve blood flow to tissue. While the locus of blood flow control (at least in skeletal muscle tissue) is widely thought to reside at the level of the arteriole, research has begun to suggest that capillary endothelial cells may be coordinators of skeletal muscle blood flow during functional hyperaemia. It is thought that vasodilators (released from active muscle fibers) can stimulate a local capillary endothelial cells which, in turn, causes the conduction of a vasodilatory signal to upstream arterioles, this then elicits arteriolar vasodilation consequently, creating a pathway of least resistance so blood flow can be precisely direct to capillaries supplying the metabolically active tissue.

Conversely, when a tissue is less metabolically active, it produces fewer metabolites which are simply washed away in blood flow.

Since most of the common nutrients in the body are converted to carbon dioxide when they are metabolized, smooth muscle around blood vessels relax in response to increased concentrations of carbon dioxide within the blood and surrounding interstitial fluid. The relaxation of this smooth muscle results in vascular dilation and increased blood flow.

Some tissues require oxygen and fuel more quickly or in greater quantities. Examples of tissues and organs that are known to have specialized mechanisms for functional hyperaemia include:

- The brain through the neuron-dependent haemodynamic response.
- Penile erection tissue by release of nitric oxide.

== Reactive hyperaemia ==
Reactive hyperemia, classified under arterial hyperemia, refers to the temporary increase in blood flow to an organ that follows a short period of ischemia or ischaemia. This condition arises due to a shortage of oxygen and an accumulation of metabolic waste resulting from the ischemic episode. A common method to assess this condition, particularly in the legs, is through Buerger's test. Furthermore, reactive hyperemia is frequently associated with Raynaud's phenomenon. In this scenario, vasospasm within the blood vessels leads to ischemia, which can cause tissue necrosis. Subsequently, there is an increased blood flow to the affected area, aimed at eliminating waste products and clearing cellular debris.
