= Phototherapeutic keratectomy =

Removal of tissue from the cornea using a laser

- Specialty: Ophthalmology

Phototherapeutic keratectomy (PTK) is a type of eye surgery that uses a laser to treat various ocular disorders by removing tissue from the cornea. PTK allows the removal of superficial corneal opacities and surface irregularities. It is similar to photorefractive keratectomy, which is used for the treatment of refractive conditions. The common indications for PTK are corneal dystrophies, scars, opacities, and bullous keratopathy.
