= Sclera =

White part of an eyeball

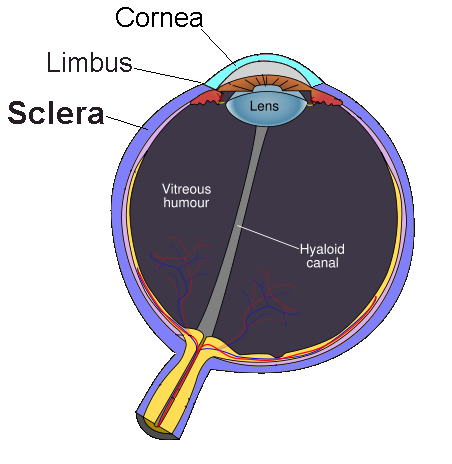
- The sclera, as separated from the cornea by the corneal limbus

Details
- Part of: Eye
- System: Visual system
- Artery: Anterior ciliary arteries, long posterior ciliary arteries, short posterior ciliary arteries

Identifiers
- Latin: sclera
- MeSH: D012590
- TA98: A15.2.02.002
- TA2: 6750
- FMA: 58269

The sclera, (Note: The word sclera (/ˈsklɛərə/ or /ˈsklɪərə/; both are common), plural sclerae (/ˈsklɛəri/ or /ˈsklɪəri/) or scleras, is from the Greek σκληρός (sklērós), meaning hard.) also known as the white of the eye or, in older literature, as the tunica albuginea oculi, is the opaque, fibrous, protective outer layer of the eye containing mainly collagen and some crucial elastic fiber.

In the development of the embryo, the sclera is derived from the neural crest. In children, it is thinner and shows some of the underlying pigment, appearing slightly blue. In the elderly, fatty deposits on the sclera can make it appear slightly yellow. People with dark skin can have naturally darkened sclerae, the result of melanin pigmentation.

In humans, and some other vertebrates, the whole sclera is white or pale, contrasting with the coloured iris.

== Structure ==
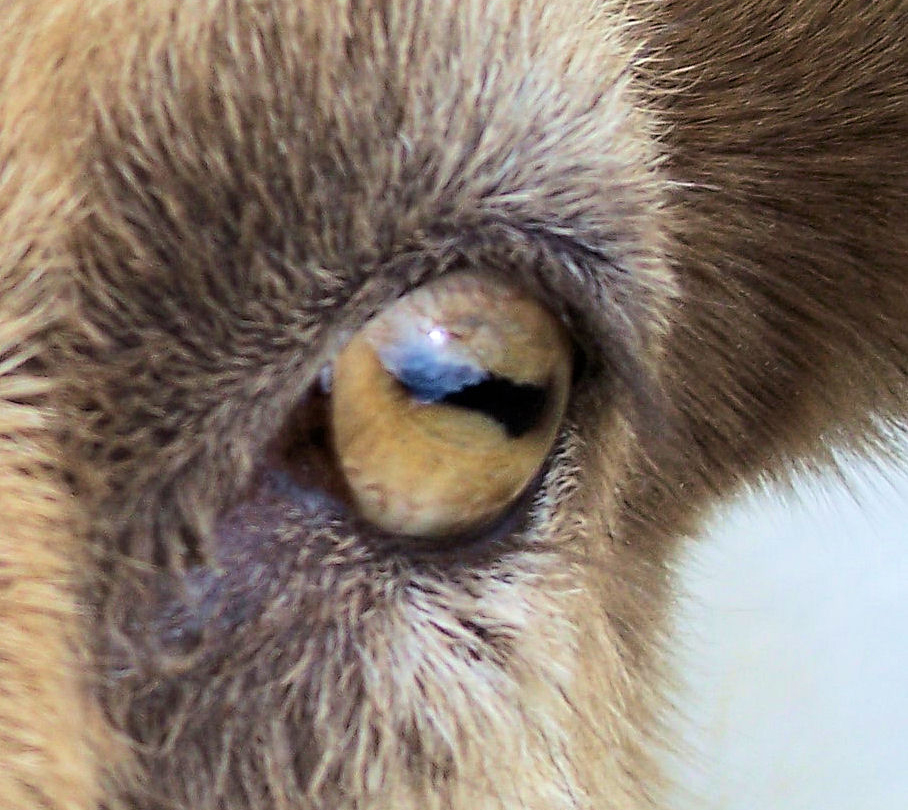
Goat eye with relatively dark sclera and horizontal pupil

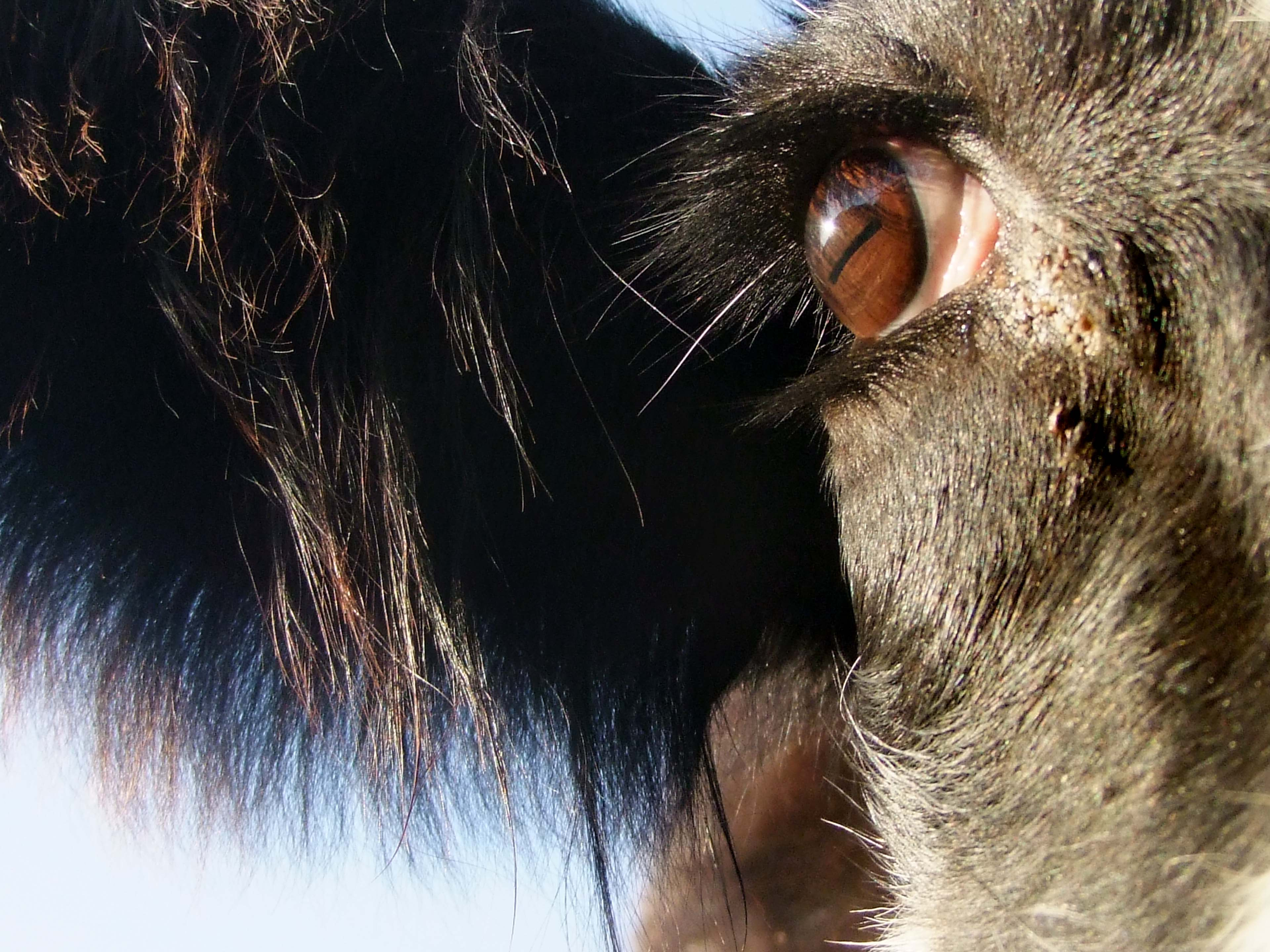
Cow eye with dark sclera

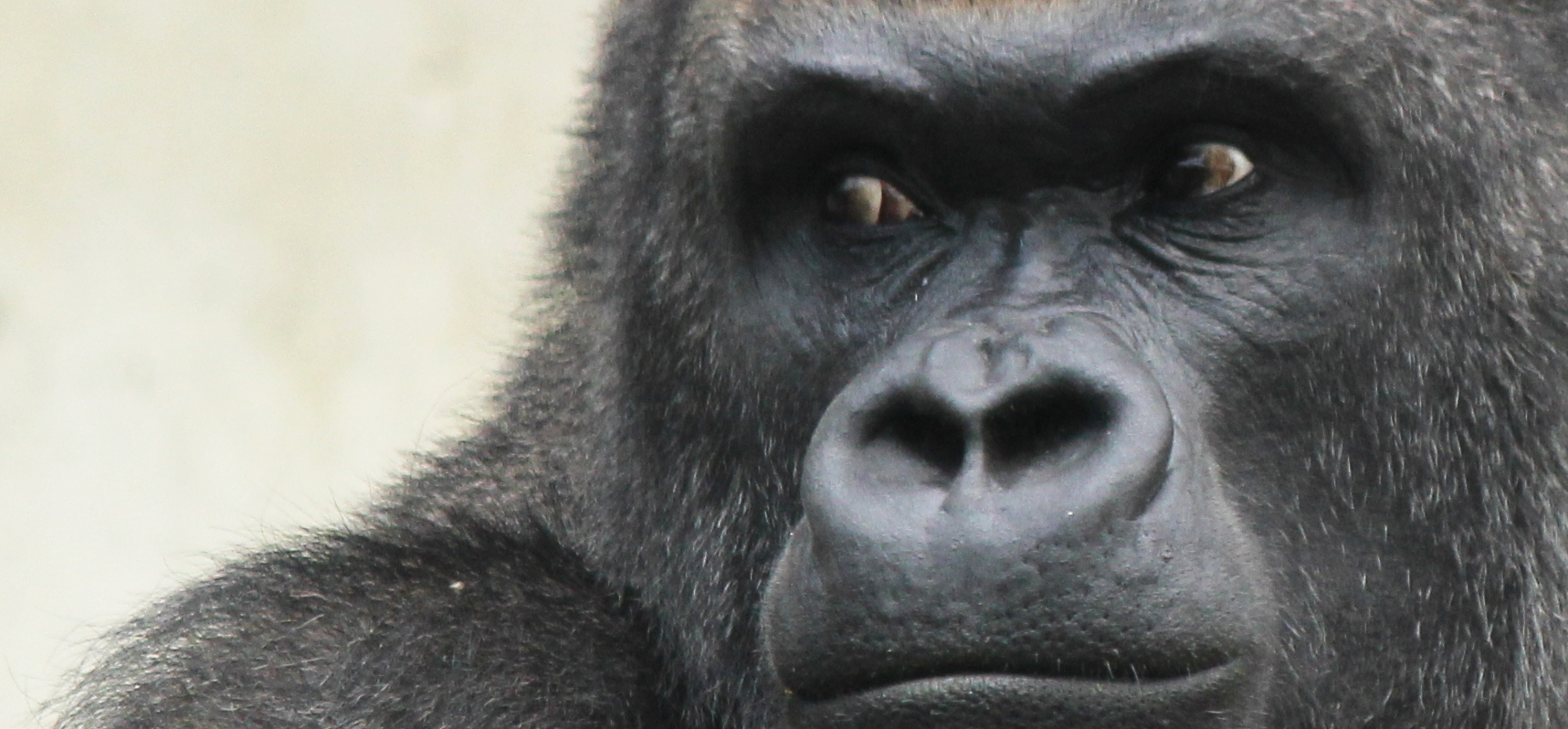
Rare whites in a western lowland gorilla

The sclera forms the posterior five-sixths of the connective tissue coat of the human eyeball. It is continuous with the dura mater and the cornea, and maintains the shape of the eyeball, offering resistance to internal and external forces, and provides an attachment for the extraocular muscle insertions. The sclera is perforated by many nerves and vessels passing through the posterior scleral foramen, the hole that is formed by the optic nerve. At the optic disc, the outer two-thirds of the sclera continues with the dura mater (outer coat of the brain) via the dural sheath of the optic nerve. The inner third joins with some choroidal tissue to form a plate (lamina cribrosa) across the optic nerve with perforations through which the optic fibers (fasciculi) pass. The thickness of the sclera varies from 1 mm at the posterior pole to 0.3 mm just behind the insertions of the four rectus muscles. The sclera's blood vessels are mainly on the surface. Along with the vessels of the conjunctiva (which is a thin layer covering the sclera), those in the episclera render the inflamed eye bright red.

In many vertebrates, the sclera is reinforced with plates of cartilage or bone, together forming a circular structure called the scleral ring. In primitive fish, this ring consists of four plates, but the number is lower in many living ray-finned fishes, and much higher in lobe-finned fishes, crocodilians, various reptiles, and birds. The ring has disappeared in many groups, including living amphibians, some reptiles and fish, and all mammals.

=== Histology ===
Histologically speaking, it is characterized as dense connective tissue made primarily of type 1 collagen fibers. The collagen of the sclera is continuous with the cornea. From outer to innermost, the four layers of the sclera are:

- episclera
- stroma
- lamina fusca
- endothelium

The sclera is opaque due to the irregularity of the Type I collagen fibers, as opposed to the near-uniform thickness and parallel arrangement of the corneal collagen. Moreover, the cornea bears more mucopolysaccharide (a carbohydrate that has among its repeating units a nitrogenous sugar, hexosamine) to embed the fibrils.

The cornea, unlike the sclera, has six layers. The middle (third in number; provided the first layer being the anterior and outermost and the sixth layer being the posterior and the inner most), thickest layer is also called the stroma. The sclera, like the cornea, contains a basal endothelium, above which there is the lamina fusca, containing a high count of pigment cells.

Sometimes, very small gray-blue spots can appear on the sclera, a harmless condition called scleral melanocytosis.

== Function ==
Human eyes are somewhat distinctive in the animal kingdom in that the sclera is very plainly visible whenever the eye is open. This is not just due to the white color of the human sclera, which many other species share, but also to the fact that the human iris is relatively small and comprises a significantly smaller portion of the exposed eye surface compared to other animals. It is theorized that this adaptation evolved because of humans' social nature as the eye became a useful communication tool in addition to a sensory organ. It is believed that the exposed sclera of the human eye makes it easier for one individual to identify where another individual is looking, increasing the efficacy of this particular form of nonverbal communication, called cooperative eye hypothesis.

Another hypothesis states that the distinctiveness of the human's sclera is due to genetic drift and sexual selection. A visibly white sclera is perceived as a sign of good health and youthfullness, this could have been a criterion of selection when looking for a mate. In this case, humans' ability to communicate with their eyes (glancing, cluing at others) would only be a consequence of a very visible sclera.

=== Trauma ===
The bony area that makes up the human eye socket provides exceptional protection to the sclera. However, if the sclera is ruptured by a blunt force or is penetrated by a sharp object, the recovery of full former vision is usually rare. If pressure is applied slowly, the eye is actually very elastic. However, most ruptures involve objects moving at some velocity. The cushion of orbital fat protects the sclera from head-on blunt forces, but damage from oblique forces striking the eye from the side is not prevented by this cushion. Hemorrhaging and a dramatic drop in intraocular pressure are common, along with a reduction in visual perception to only broad hand movements and the presence or absence of light. However, a low-velocity injury which does not puncture and penetrate the sclera requires only superficial treatment and the removal of the object. Sufficiently small objects which become embedded and which are subsequently left untreated may eventually become surrounded by a benign cyst, causing no other damage or discomfort.

=== Thermal trauma ===
The sclera is rarely damaged by brief exposure to heat: the eyelids provide exceptional protection, and the fact that the sclera is covered in layers of moist tissue means that these tissues are able to cause much of the offending heat to become dissipated as steam before the sclera itself is damaged. Even relatively low-temperature molten metals when splashed against an open eye have been shown to cause very little damage to the sclera, even while creating detailed casts of the surrounding eyelashes. Prolonged exposure, however—on the order of 30 seconds—at temperatures above 45 °C (113 °F) will begin to cause scarring, and above 55 °C (131 °F) will cause extreme changes in the sclera and surrounding tissue. Such long exposures even in industrial settings are virtually nonexistent.

=== Chemical injury ===
The sclera is highly resistant to injury from brief exposure to toxic chemicals. The reflexive production of tears at the onset of chemical exposure tends to quickly wash away such irritants, preventing further harm. Acids with a pH below 2.5 are the source of greatest acidic burn risk, with sulfuric acid, the kind present in car batteries and therefore commonly available, being among the most dangerous in this regard. However, acid burns, even severe ones, seldom result in loss of the eye.

Alkali burns, on the other hand, such as those resulting from exposure to ammonium hydroxide or ammonium chloride or other chemicals with a pH above 11.5, will cause cellular tissue in the sclera to saponify and should be considered medical emergencies requiring immediate treatment.

== Abnormal coloring ==
Redness of the sclera is typically caused by eye irritation causing blood vessels to expand, such as in conjunctivitis ("pink eye"). Episcleritis is a generally benign condition of the episclera causing eye redness. Scleritis is a serious inflammatory disease of the sclera causing redness of the sclera often progressing to purple.

Yellowing or a light green color of the sclera is a visual symptom of jaundice.

In cases of osteogenesis imperfecta, the sclera may appear to have a blue tint, more pronounced than the slight blue tint seen in children. The blue tint is caused by the showing of the underlying uveal tract (choroid and retinal pigment epithelium).

In those with Ehlers–Danlos syndrome, the sclera may be tinted blue due to the lack of proper connective tissue.

In very rare but severe cases of kidney failure and liver failure, the sclera may turn black.

Early reports of white sclera in chimpanzees have been reported as possibly pathological and considered anomalies. Though this assumption is a good starting point in creating a foundation for what we know about sclera in animals, sources have experienced challenges acquiring large sample sizes in order to come up with conclusive evidence to support these claims fully.

== Sclera in animals ==
The cooperative eye hypothesis suggests that the pale sclera evolved as a method of nonverbal communication that makes it easier for one individual to identify where another individual is looking. In addition to this, the "cooperative eye hypothesis" expands on the proposal that white sclera are a sign of good health, being useful for mate selection. However, the cooperative eye hypothesis has been questioned based on correspondence between known eye gaze following certain behaviors like the stare-in-the-crowd effect and depigmentation patterns. There is also evidence to suggest that eye visibility promotes altruistic behavior by letting others know they are being watched.

Animal researchers have found that, in the course of their domestication, dogs have also developed the ability to pick up visual cues from the eyes of humans. Dogs do not seem to use this form of communication with one another and only look for visual information from the eyes of humans. Chimpanzees have also been found to be able to discern gaze direction in humans, and are the only other animals found to do this thus far.

Other mammals with white or pale sclera include chimpanzees, many orangutans, some gorillas, and bonobos. The eyes of all non-human primates have been thought to be dark with small, barely visible sclera, but recent research has suggested that white sclera are not uncommon in chimpanzees, and are also present in other mammals. Most non-human mammals are thought to have a darker sclera which conceals gaze direction. This is thought to be helpful in competitive and social situations to conceal motives.

Specifically, diurnal animals often have darker sclera to protect the eyes from UV, especially in larger animals where more sclera is exposed. Melanin plays an important role in the pigmentation of the sclera in humans and other animals. Melanin pigment in the sclera is similar to the pigment in the skin and irises where it absorbs UV radiation to prevent deeper penetration and damage to the eyes. Nocturnal animals have larger eyes and pupils to maximize light, while diurnal animals have smaller eyes to enhance visual acuity in bright light. This leads to increasing trends of nocturnal animals having larger sclera and eyeballs overall while diurnal animals have smaller ones for daylight activities.

== See also ==
- Extraocular implant
- Extraocular muscles
  - Rectus muscles:
    - Inferior rectus muscle
    - Lateral rectus muscle
    - Medial rectus muscle
    - Superior rectus muscle
- Scleral tattooing
- Sclerotomy
