= Photophobia =

Abnormal intolerance to visual perception of light

- Specialty: Ophthalmology
- Symptoms: Low tolerance to light on eyes, eye pain
- Risk factors: Albinism, corneal abrasion, ocular nerve damage
- Treatment: treatment of underlying cause, sunglasses

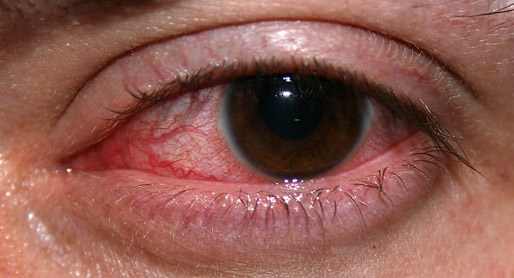

Photophobia is a medical symptom of abnormal intolerance to visual perception of light. As a medical symptom, photophobia is not a morbid fear or phobia, but an experience of discomfort or pain to the eyes due to light exposure or by presence of actual physical sensitivity of the eyes, though the term is sometimes additionally applied to abnormal or irrational fear of light, such as heliophobia. The term photophobia comes from Greek φῶς (phōs) 'light' and φόβος (phóbos) 'fear'.

== Causes ==
Patients may develop photophobia as a result of eye disease or injury, neurological or psychiatric disorders, or as a side effect of certain drugs.

Photophobia may manifest itself in an increased response to light starting at any step in the visual system, such as:

- Too much light entering the eye. Too much light can enter the eye if it is damaged, such as with corneal abrasion and retinal damage, or if its pupil is unable to normally constrict (seen with damage to the oculomotor nerve).
- Due to albinism, the lack of pigment in the colored part of the eyes (irises) makes them somewhat translucent. This means that the irises cannot completely block light from entering the eye.
- Overstimulation of the photoreceptors in the retina
- Excessive electric impulses to the optic nerve
- Excessive response in the central nervous system

Common causes of photophobia include migraine, temporomandibular joint dysfunction, cataracts, Sjögren syndrome, mild traumatic brain injury (MTBI), or severe eye diseases such as uveitis or corneal abrasion. A more extensive list follows:

=== Eye-related ===
Causes of photophobia relating directly to the eye itself include:

- Achromatopsia
- Aniridia
- Anticholinergic drugs may cause photophobia by paralyzing the iris sphincter muscle
- Aphakia
- Blepharitis
- Buphthalmos
- Cataracts
- Coloboma
- Cone dystrophy
- Congenital abnormalities of the eye
- Viral conjunctivitis
- Corneal abrasion
- Corneal dystrophy
- Corneal ulcer
- Disruption of the corneal epithelium, such as that caused by a corneal foreign body or keratitis
- Ectopia lentis
- Endophthalmitis
- Eye trauma caused by disease, injury, or infection such as chalazion, episcleritis, keratoconus, or optic nerve hypoplasia
- Hydrophthalmos, or congenital glaucoma
- Iritis
- Isotretinoin has been associated with photophobia
- Optic neuritis
- Pigment dispersion syndrome
- Pupillary dilation (naturally or chemically induced)
- Retinal detachment
- Scarring of the cornea or sclera
- Uveitis

=== Nervous-system-related ===
Neurological causes for photophobia include:

- Autism spectrum disorder
- Chiari malformation
- Dyslexia
- Encephalitis, including myalgic encephalomyelitis
- Meningitis
- Trigeminal disturbance causes central sensitization (hence, multiple other associated hypersensitivities). Causes can be bad bite, infected tooth, etc.
- Progressive supranuclear palsy, where photophobia can sometimes precede the clinical diagnosis by years
- Subarachnoid haemorrhage
- Tumor of the posterior cranial fossa
- Visual snow along with many symptoms

=== Other causes ===
- Ankylosing spondylitis
- Albinism
- Ariboflavinosis
- Benzodiazepines
- Chemotherapy
- Chikungunya
- Cystinosis
- Drug withdrawal
- Ehlers–Danlos syndrome
- Infectious mononucleosis
- Influenza
- Magnesium deficiency
- Mercury poisoning
- Migraine
- Mustard gas exposure
- Rabies
- Tyrosinemia type II
- Superior canal dehiscence syndrome

== Treatment ==
Treatment for light sensitivity addresses the underlying cause, whether it be an eye, nervous system or other cause. If the triggering factor or underlying cause can be identified and treated, photophobia may disappear. Tinted glasses are sometimes used.

== Artificial light ==
People with photophobia may feel eye pain from even moderate levels of artificial light and avert their eyes from artificial light sources. Ambient levels of artificial light may also be intolerable to people afflicted with photophobia such that they dim or remove the light source, or go into a dimmer lit room, such a one lit by refraction of light from outside the room. Alternatively, they may wear dark sunglasses, sunglasses designed to filter peripheral light, precision tinted glasses, and/or wide-brimmed sun hats or baseball caps. Some types of photophobia may be helped with the use of precision tinted lenses which block the green-to-blue end of the light spectrum without blurring or impeding vision.

Other strategies for relieving photophobia include the use of tinted contact lenses and/or the use of prescription eye drops that constrict the pupil, thus reducing the amount of light entering the eye. Such strategies may be limited by the amount of light needed for proper vision under given conditions, however. Dilating drops may also help relieve eye pain from muscle spasms or seizures triggered by lighting/migraine, allowing a person to "ride out the migraine" in a dark or dim room. A paper by Stringham and Hammond, published in the Journal of Food Science, reviews studies of effects of consuming lutein and zeaxanthin on visual performance, and notes a decrease in sensitivity to glare.

== Disability ==
Photophobia may preclude or limit a person from working in places where lighting is used, unless the person is able to obtain a reasonable accommodation like being allowed to wear tinted glasses. Some people with photophobia may thereby be better able to work at night or be more easily accommodated in the workplace at night.

Outdoor night lighting may be equally offensive for persons with photophobia, however, given the wide variety of bright lighting used for illuminating residential, commercial and industrial areas, such as LED (light-emitting diode) lamps.

The increasing popularity of "overpoweringly intense" LED headlights being used on "pickups and S.U.V.s" has prompted more frequent reports of photophobia among motorists, cyclists, and pedestrians.

== See also ==
- Photic sneeze reflex, a medical condition by which people exposed to bright light sneeze
- Photosensitivity in humans
