= List of MeSH codes (C21) =

The following is a partial list of the "C" codes for Medical Subject Headings (MeSH), as defined by the United States National Library of Medicine (NLM).

This list continues the information at List of MeSH codes (C20). Codes following these are found at List of MeSH codes (C22). For other MeSH codes, see List of MeSH codes.

The source for this content is the set of 2006 MeSH Trees from the NLM.

== MeSH C21 – disorders of environmental origin ==
=== MeSH C21.447 – occupational diseases ===
==== MeSH C21.447.080 – agricultural workers' diseases ====
- MeSH C21.447.080.365 – farmer's lung
- MeSH C21.447.080.752 – silo filler's disease

==== MeSH C21.447.800 – pneumoconiosis ====
- MeSH C21.447.800.127 – asbestosis
- MeSH C21.447.800.225 – berylliosis
- MeSH C21.447.800.323 – byssinosis
- MeSH C21.447.800.340 – caplan's syndrome
- MeSH C21.447.800.773 – siderosis
- MeSH C21.447.800.834 – silicosis
- MeSH C21.447.800.834.201 – anthracosilicosis
- MeSH C21.447.800.834.752 – silicotuberculosis

=== MeSH C21.613 – poisoning ===
==== MeSH C21.613.127 – bites and stings ====
- MeSH C21.613.127.141 – arachnidism
- MeSH C21.613.127.441 – insect bites and stings
- MeSH C21.613.127.722 – snake bites
- MeSH C21.613.127.857 – tick toxicoses
- MeSH C21.613.127.857.707 – tick paralysis

==== MeSH C21.613.276 – drug toxicity ====
- MeSH C21.613.276.505 – drug eruptions
- MeSH C21.613.276.505.350 – epidermal necrolysis, toxic
- MeSH C21.613.276.505.375 – erythema nodosum
- MeSH C21.613.276.505.800 – serum sickness
- MeSH C21.613.276.720 – serotonin syndrome

==== MeSH C21.613.415 – food poisoning ====
- MeSH C21.613.415.151 – botulism
- MeSH C21.613.415.246 – ciguatera poisoning
- MeSH C21.613.415.341 – favism
- MeSH C21.613.415.551 – mushroom poisoning
- MeSH C21.613.415.738 – salmonella food poisoning
- MeSH C21.613.415.846 – staphylococcal food poisoning

==== MeSH C21.613.455 – gas poisoning ====
- MeSH C21.613.455.245 – carbon monoxide poisoning
- MeSH C21.613.455.571 – inert gas narcosis

==== MeSH C21.613.512 – hepatitis, toxic ====
- MeSH C21.613.512.200 – hepatitis, chronic, drug-induced

==== MeSH C21.613.589 – lead poisoning ====
- MeSH C21.613.589.500 – lead poisoning, nervous system
- MeSH C21.613.589.500.400 – lead poisoning, nervous system, adult
- MeSH C21.613.589.500.700 – lead poisoning, nervous system, childhood

==== MeSH C21.613.647 – mercury poisoning ====
- MeSH C21.613.647.500 – mercury poisoning, nervous system
- MeSH C21.613.647.500.100 – acrodynia

==== MeSH C21.613.680 – mycotoxicosis ====
- MeSH C21.613.680.262 – ergotism
- MeSH C21.613.680.551 – mushroom poisoning

==== MeSH C21.613.705 – neurotoxicity syndromes ====
- MeSH C21.613.705.100 – akathisia, drug-induced
- MeSH C21.613.705.150 – alcohol-induced disorders, nervous system
- MeSH C21.613.705.150.100 – alcohol amnestic disorder
- MeSH C21.613.705.150.100.500 – korsakoff syndrome
- MeSH C21.613.705.150.200 – alcohol withdrawal delirium
- MeSH C21.613.705.150.300 – alcohol withdrawal seizures
- MeSH C21.613.705.150.400 – alcoholic neuropathy
- MeSH C21.613.705.200 – dyskinesia, drug-induced
- MeSH C21.613.705.400 – mptp poisoning
- MeSH C21.613.705.600 – neuroleptic malignant syndrome

==== MeSH C21.613.756 – plant poisoning ====
- MeSH C21.613.756.262 – ergotism
- MeSH C21.613.756.375 – favism
- MeSH C21.613.756.558 – lathyrism
- MeSH C21.613.756.600 – milk sickness

==== MeSH C21.613.809 – psychoses, substance-induced ====
- MeSH C21.613.809.750 – psychoses, alcoholic

=== MeSH C21.739 – substance-related disorders ===
==== MeSH C21.739.100 – alcohol-related disorders ====
- MeSH C21.739.100.087 – alcohol-induced disorders
- MeSH C21.739.100.087.193 – alcohol-induced disorders, nervous system
- MeSH C21.739.100.087.193.100 – alcohol amnestic disorder
- MeSH C21.739.100.087.193.100.500 – korsakoff syndrome
- MeSH C21.739.100.087.193.200 – alcohol withdrawal delirium
- MeSH C21.739.100.087.193.300 – alcohol withdrawal seizures
- MeSH C21.739.100.087.193.400 – alcoholic neuropathy
- MeSH C21.739.100.087.250 – cardiomyopathy, alcoholic
- MeSH C21.739.100.087.397 – fetal alcohol syndrome
- MeSH C21.739.100.087.645 – liver diseases, alcoholic
- MeSH C21.739.100.087.645.390 – fatty liver, alcoholic
- MeSH C21.739.100.087.645.490 – hepatitis, alcoholic
- MeSH C21.739.100.087.645.550 – liver cirrhosis, alcoholic
- MeSH C21.739.100.087.730 – pancreatitis, alcoholic
- MeSH C21.739.100.087.750 – psychoses, alcoholic
- MeSH C21.739.100.175 – alcoholic intoxication
- MeSH C21.739.100.250 – alcoholism
- MeSH C21.739.100.625 – wernicke encephalopathy

==== MeSH C21.739.675 – opioid-related disorders ====
- MeSH C21.739.675.400 – heroin dependence
- MeSH C21.739.675.600 – morphine dependence

==== MeSH C21.739.835 – substance withdrawal syndrome ====
- MeSH C21.739.835.250 – alcohol withdrawal delirium
- MeSH C21.739.835.500 – alcohol withdrawal seizures

=== MeSH C21.866 – wounds and injuries ===
==== MeSH C21.866.017 – abdominal injuries ====
- MeSH C21.866.017.258 – hernia, diaphragmatic, traumatic
- MeSH C21.866.017.680 – splenic rupture
- MeSH C21.866.017.680.500 – splenosis
- MeSH C21.866.017.809 – stomach rupture

==== MeSH C21.866.088 – arm injuries ====
- MeSH C21.866.088.268 – forearm injuries
- MeSH C21.866.088.268.556 – radius fractures
- MeSH C21.866.088.268.807 – ulna fractures
- MeSH C21.866.088.390 – humeral fractures
- MeSH C21.866.088.666 – shoulder dislocation
- MeSH C21.866.088.749 – shoulder fractures
- MeSH C21.866.088.890 – tennis elbow
- MeSH C21.866.088.906 – wrist injuries

==== MeSH C21.866.117 – back injuries ====
- MeSH C21.866.117.500 – spinal injuries
- MeSH C21.866.117.500.500 – spinal fractures

==== MeSH C21.866.120 – barotrauma ====
- MeSH C21.866.120.126 – blast injuries
- MeSH C21.866.120.248 – decompression sickness

==== MeSH C21.866.141 – birth injuries ====
- MeSH C21.866.141.587 – paralysis, obstetric

==== MeSH C21.866.153 – bites and stings ====
- MeSH C21.866.153.311 – bites, human

==== MeSH C21.866.200 – burns ====
- MeSH C21.866.200.156 – burns, chemical
- MeSH C21.866.200.239 – burns, electric
- MeSH C21.866.200.322 – burns, inhalation
- MeSH C21.866.200.322.800 – smoke inhalation injury
- MeSH C21.866.200.503 – eye burns
- MeSH C21.866.200.855 – sunburn

==== MeSH C21.866.260 – craniocerebral trauma ====
- MeSH C21.866.260.118 – brain injuries
- MeSH C21.866.260.118.150 – brain concussion
- MeSH C21.866.260.118.150.500 – post-concussion syndrome
- MeSH C21.866.260.118.175 – brain hemorrhage, traumatic
- MeSH C21.866.260.118.175.150 – brain stem hemorrhage, traumatic
- MeSH C21.866.260.118.175.300 – cerebral hemorrhage, traumatic
- MeSH C21.866.260.118.200 – brain injury, chronic
- MeSH C21.866.260.118.300 – diffuse axonal injury
- MeSH C21.866.260.118.475 – epilepsy, post-traumatic
- MeSH C21.866.260.118.650 – pneumocephalus
- MeSH C21.866.260.118.825 – shaken baby syndrome
- MeSH C21.866.260.177 – cerebrospinal fluid otorrhea
- MeSH C21.866.260.207 – cerebrospinal fluid rhinorrhea
- MeSH C21.866.260.222 – coma, post-head injury
- MeSH C21.866.260.237 – cranial nerve injuries
- MeSH C21.866.260.237.162 – abducens nerve injury
- MeSH C21.866.260.237.325 – facial nerve injuries
- MeSH C21.866.260.237.650 – optic nerve injuries
- MeSH C21.866.260.275 – facial injuries
- MeSH C21.866.260.275.250 – eye injuries
- MeSH C21.866.260.275.250.250 – eye burns
- MeSH C21.866.260.275.250.260 – eye foreign bodies
- MeSH C21.866.260.275.250.270 – eye injuries, penetrating
- MeSH C21.866.260.275.500 – maxillofacial injuries
- MeSH C21.866.260.275.500.400 – jaw fractures
- MeSH C21.866.260.275.500.400.255 – mandibular fractures
- MeSH C21.866.260.275.500.400.510 – maxillary fractures
- MeSH C21.866.260.275.500.500 – mandibular injuries
- MeSH C21.866.260.275.500.550 – orbital fractures
- MeSH C21.866.260.275.500.950 – zygomatic fractures
- MeSH C21.866.260.382 – head injuries, closed
- MeSH C21.866.260.538 – head injuries, penetrating
- MeSH C21.866.260.616 – intracranial hemorrhage, traumatic
- MeSH C21.866.260.616.300 – hematoma, epidural, cranial
- MeSH C21.866.260.616.600 – hematoma, subdural
- MeSH C21.866.260.616.600.050 – hematoma, subdural, acute
- MeSH C21.866.260.616.600.120 – hematoma, subdural, chronic
- MeSH C21.866.260.616.600.400 – hematoma, subdural, intracranial
- MeSH C21.866.260.616.800 – subarachnoid hemorrhage, traumatic
- MeSH C21.866.260.836 – skull fractures
- MeSH C21.866.260.836.150 – skull fracture, basilar
- MeSH C21.866.260.836.300 – skull fracture, depressed

==== MeSH C21.866.289 – dislocations ====
- MeSH C21.866.289.384 – hip dislocation
- MeSH C21.866.289.500 – knee dislocation
- MeSH C21.866.289.625 – patellar dislocation
- MeSH C21.866.289.650 – pubic symphysis diastasis
- MeSH C21.866.289.750 – shoulder dislocation

==== MeSH C21.866.304 – drowning ====
- MeSH C21.866.304.500 – near drowning

==== MeSH C21.866.324 – electric injuries ====
- MeSH C21.866.324.323 – burns, electric
- MeSH C21.866.324.550 – lightning injuries

==== MeSH C21.866.392 – foreign bodies ====
- MeSH C21.866.392.183 – bezoars
- MeSH C21.866.392.421 – eye foreign bodies
- MeSH C21.866.392.500 – foreign-body migration
- MeSH C21.866.392.560 – foreign-body reaction
- MeSH C21.866.392.560.325 – granuloma, foreign-body

==== MeSH C21.866.404 – fractures, bone ====
- MeSH C21.866.404.061 – femoral fractures
- MeSH C21.866.404.061.425 – hip fractures
- MeSH C21.866.404.061.425.500 – femoral neck fractures
- MeSH C21.866.404.124 – fractures, closed
- MeSH C21.866.404.186 – fractures, comminuted
- MeSH C21.866.404.195 – fractures, compression
- MeSH C21.866.404.249 – fractures, malunited
- MeSH C21.866.404.311 – fractures, open
- MeSH C21.866.404.374 – fractures, spontaneous
- MeSH C21.866.404.437 – fractures, stress
- MeSH C21.866.404.468 – fractures, ununited
- MeSH C21.866.404.468.627 – pseudarthrosis
- MeSH C21.866.404.484 – hip fractures
- MeSH C21.866.404.500 – humeral fractures
- MeSH C21.866.404.562 – radius fractures
- MeSH C21.866.404.562.356 – colles' fracture
- MeSH C21.866.404.593 – rib fractures
- MeSH C21.866.404.625 – shoulder fractures
- MeSH C21.866.404.750 – skull fractures
- MeSH C21.866.404.750.467 – jaw fractures
- MeSH C21.866.404.750.467.441 – mandibular fractures
- MeSH C21.866.404.750.467.611 – maxillary fractures
- MeSH C21.866.404.750.684 – orbital fractures
- MeSH C21.866.404.750.821 – skull fracture, basilar
- MeSH C21.866.404.750.890 – skull fracture, depressed
- MeSH C21.866.404.750.959 – zygomatic fractures
- MeSH C21.866.404.812 – spinal fractures
- MeSH C21.866.404.875 – tibial fractures
- MeSH C21.866.404.937 – ulna fractures
- MeSH C21.866.404.937.547 – monteggia's fracture

==== MeSH C21.866.417 – frostbite ====
- MeSH C21.866.417.217 – chilblains

==== MeSH C21.866.448 – hand injuries ====
- MeSH C21.866.448.429 – finger injuries

==== MeSH C21.866.522 – heat stress disorders ====
- MeSH C21.866.522.250 – heat exhaustion
- MeSH C21.866.522.250.800 – sunstroke
- MeSH C21.866.522.500 – heat stroke

==== MeSH C21.866.531 – hip injuries ====
- MeSH C21.866.531.500 – hip dislocation
- MeSH C21.866.531.750 – hip fractures

==== MeSH C21.866.558 – leg injuries ====
- MeSH C21.866.558.100 – ankle injuries
- MeSH C21.866.558.276 – femoral fractures
- MeSH C21.866.558.276.425 – hip fractures
- MeSH C21.866.558.276.425.500 – femoral neck fractures
- MeSH C21.866.558.300 – foot injuries
- MeSH C21.866.558.554 – knee injuries
- MeSH C21.866.558.554.500 – knee dislocation
- MeSH C21.866.558.554.750 – patellar dislocation
- MeSH C21.866.558.857 – tibial fractures

==== MeSH C21.866.700 – neck injuries ====
- MeSH C21.866.700.500 – whiplash injuries

==== MeSH C21.866.733 – radiation injuries ====
- MeSH C21.866.733.031 – abnormalities, radiation-induced
- MeSH C21.866.733.345 – leukemia, radiation-induced
- MeSH C21.866.733.476 – neoplasms, radiation-induced
- MeSH C21.866.733.579 – osteoradionecrosis
- MeSH C21.866.733.720 – radiation injuries, experimental
- MeSH C21.866.733.762 – radiation pneumonitis
- MeSH C21.866.733.804 – radiodermatitis

==== MeSH C21.866.761 – rupture ====
- MeSH C21.866.761.125 – aortic rupture
- MeSH C21.866.761.555 – splenic rupture
- MeSH C21.866.761.555.500 – splenosis
- MeSH C21.866.761.684 – stomach rupture
- MeSH C21.866.761.853 – uterine rupture
- MeSH C21.866.761.853.500 – uterine perforation

==== MeSH C21.866.797 – shock, traumatic ====
- MeSH C21.866.797.240 – crush syndrome

==== MeSH C21.866.819 – spinal cord injuries ====
- MeSH C21.866.819.339 – central cord syndrome
- MeSH C21.866.819.678 – spinal cord compression

==== MeSH C21.866.831 – spinal injuries ====
- MeSH C21.866.831.600 – spinal fractures

==== MeSH C21.866.844 – sprains and strains ====
- MeSH C21.866.844.150 – cumulative trauma disorders
- MeSH C21.866.844.150.206 – carpal tunnel syndrome
- MeSH C21.866.844.150.957 – ulnar nerve compression syndromes
- MeSH C21.866.844.150.957.200 – cubital tunnel syndrome

==== MeSH C21.866.874 – tendon injuries ====
- MeSH C21.866.874.800 – tendinopathy

==== MeSH C21.866.891 – thoracic injuries ====
- MeSH C21.866.891.315 – flail chest
- MeSH C21.866.891.375 – heart injuries
- MeSH C21.866.891.733 – rib fractures

==== MeSH C21.866.900 – tooth injuries ====
- MeSH C21.866.900.725 – tooth avulsion
- MeSH C21.866.900.750 – tooth fractures
- MeSH C21.866.900.750.300 – cracked tooth syndrome

==== MeSH C21.866.915 – trauma, nervous system ====
- MeSH C21.866.915.200 – cerebrovascular trauma
- MeSH C21.866.915.200.200 – carotid artery injuries
- MeSH C21.866.915.200.200.500 – carotid artery, internal, dissection
- MeSH C21.866.915.200.200.550 – carotid-cavernous sinus fistula
- MeSH C21.866.915.200.600 – vertebral artery dissection
- MeSH C21.866.915.300 – craniocerebral trauma
- MeSH C21.866.915.300.200 – brain injuries
- MeSH C21.866.915.300.200.150 – brain concussion
- MeSH C21.866.915.300.200.150.500 – post-concussion syndrome
- MeSH C21.866.915.300.200.175 – brain hemorrhage, traumatic
- MeSH C21.866.915.300.200.175.200 – brain stem hemorrhage, traumatic
- MeSH C21.866.915.300.200.175.300 – cerebral hemorrhage, traumatic
- MeSH C21.866.915.300.200.200 – brain injury, chronic
- MeSH C21.866.915.300.200.300 – diffuse axonal injury
- MeSH C21.866.915.300.200.475 – epilepsy, post-traumatic
- MeSH C21.866.915.300.200.650 – pneumocephalus
- MeSH C21.866.915.300.200.825 – shaken baby syndrome
- MeSH C21.866.915.300.250 – cerebrospinal fluid otorrhea
- MeSH C21.866.915.300.300 – cerebrospinal fluid rhinorrhea
- MeSH C21.866.915.300.350 – coma, post-head injury
- MeSH C21.866.915.300.400 – cranial nerve injuries
- MeSH C21.866.915.300.400.100 – abducens nerve injury
- MeSH C21.866.915.300.400.300 – facial nerve injuries
- MeSH C21.866.915.300.400.650 – optic nerve injuries
- MeSH C21.866.915.300.450 – head injuries, closed
- MeSH C21.866.915.300.475 – head injuries, penetrating
- MeSH C21.866.915.300.490 – intracranial hemorrhage, traumatic
- MeSH C21.866.915.300.490.150 – brain hemorrhage, traumatic
- MeSH C21.866.915.300.490.150.200 – brain stem hemorrhage, traumatic
- MeSH C21.866.915.300.490.150.300 – cerebral hemorrhage, traumatic
- MeSH C21.866.915.300.490.400 – hematoma, epidural, cranial
- MeSH C21.866.915.300.490.450 – hematoma, subdural
- MeSH C21.866.915.300.490.450.050 – hematoma, subdural, acute
- MeSH C21.866.915.300.490.450.120 – hematoma, subdural, chronic
- MeSH C21.866.915.300.490.450.400 – hematoma, subdural, intracranial
- MeSH C21.866.915.300.490.700 – subarachnoid hemorrhage, traumatic
- MeSH C21.866.915.300.745 – skull fractures
- MeSH C21.866.915.300.745.300 – skull fracture, basilar
- MeSH C21.866.915.300.745.350 – skull fracture, depressed

==== MeSH C21.866.974 – wounds, nonpenetrating ====
- MeSH C21.866.974.150 – brain concussion
- MeSH C21.866.974.150.500 – post-concussion syndrome
- MeSH C21.866.974.250 – contusions
- MeSH C21.866.974.382 – head injuries, closed
- MeSH C21.866.974.382.200 – brain concussion
- MeSH C21.866.974.382.200.500 – post-concussion syndrome

==== MeSH C21.866.986 – wounds, penetrating ====
- MeSH C21.866.986.224 – decapitation
- MeSH C21.866.986.450 – eye injuries, penetrating
- MeSH C21.866.986.500 – head injuries, penetrating
- MeSH C21.866.986.900 – wounds, gunshot
- MeSH C21.866.986.950 – wounds, stab
- MeSH C21.866.986.950.500 – needlestick injuries

The list continues at List of MeSH codes (C22).
