= Canthotomy =

Eye surgery

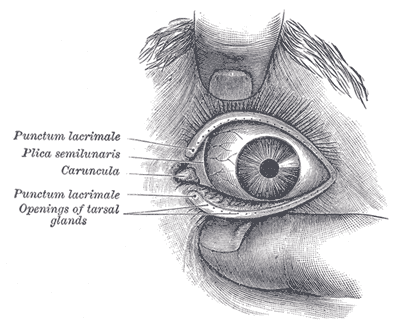
- Eye anatomy demonstrating the medial canthus
- Pronunciation: kăn-thŏt′ə-mē
- Other names: Lateral canthotomy, canthotomy with cantholysis
- Specialty: Ophthalmology and emergency medicine
- Complications: Iatrogenic globe injury, bleeding, infection

Canthotomy (also called lateral canthotomy and canthotomy with cantholysis) is a surgical procedure where the lateral canthus, or corner, of the eye is cut to relieve the fluid pressure inside or behind the eye, known as intraocular pressure (IOC). The procedure is typically done in emergency situations when the intraocular pressure becomes too high, which can damage the optic nerve and lead to blindness if left untreated.

The most common cause of elevated intraocular pressure is orbital compartment syndrome (OCS) caused by trauma, retrobulbar hemorrhage, infections, tumors, or prolonged hypoxemia. Absolute contraindications to canthotomy include globe rupture. Complications include bleeding, infections, cosmetic deformities, and functional impairment of eyelids. Lateral canthotomy further specifies that the lateral canthus is being cut. Canthotomy with cantholysis includes cutting the lateral palpebral ligament, also known as the canthal tendon.

== History ==
The first case of orbital compartment syndrome causing monocular blindness was published in 1950 due to a complication of a zygomatic fracture repair. In 1953, the first surgical orbital decompression was performed. Two incisions below and above the external canthus were made and surgical drains were put in place. In 1990, the first lateral canthotomy procedure as presently performed was completed. In 1994, lateral canthotomy was first published in a review of procedures that emergency physicians can perform. Today, a canthotomy is almost always performed with cantholysis of the inferior canthal tendon as this provides the best decompression of intraocular pressure.

== Indications ==
A canthotomy is often used as a last resort to decompress orbital compartment syndrome. Orbital compartment syndrome can be caused by trauma, infections, tumors, retrobulbar hemorrhage, or prolonged hypoxemia. Orbital compartment syndrome can be recognized by elevated intraocular pressure, globe compressibility, afferent pupillary defect, proptosis, decreased visual acuity, and decreased extraocular muscle movements.

Studies in animals have demonstrated irreversible vision loss within 90 to 120 minutes, further indicating the emergent nature of this procedure. In an unconscious patient who is unable to comply with a physical exam, an intraocular pressure greater than 40 indicates emergent canthotomy.

== Contraindications ==
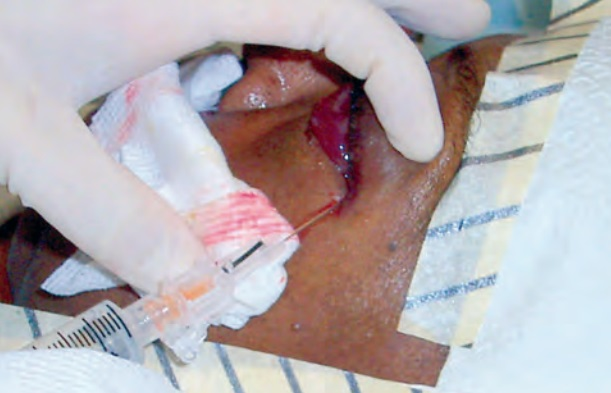
Anesthetizing the lateral canthus

The foremost absolute contraindication to canthotomy is globe rupture, sometimes referred to as an open globe injury. Globe rupture can be recognized by these symptoms or physical exam features:

- Irregular-shaped pupil or iris
- Subconjunctival hemorrhage
- Enophthalmos
- Conjunctival or scleral tear

Due to the emergent nature of this procedure and the possibility of restoring or preventing vision loss, globe rupture is the only absolute contraindication.

== Complications ==
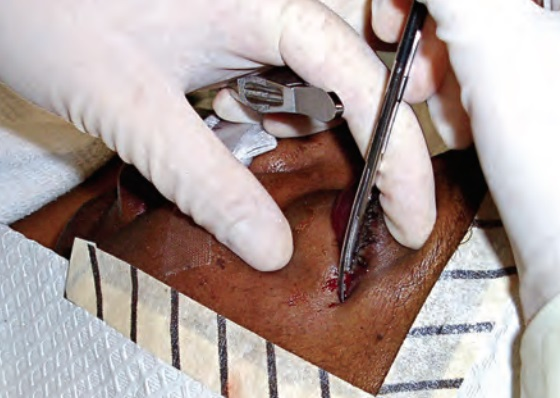
Cutting lateral canthus

Due to portions of the procedure having poor visualization of anatomical structures, and the overall rarity and difficulty of the procedure, iatrogenic globe injury is an immediate complication that can occur. Other complications include infections, bleeding, cosmetic deformities, and functional impairment of eyelids.

== Alternatives ==
Due to the infrequency and difficulty of canthotomy, emergency medicine physicians defer more than 50 percent of canthotomies to a consulting physician, which in turn can increase time to treatment. In an effort to decrease difficulty and improve patient outcomes, vertical lid split or paracanthal "one-snip" procedures have been studied. This is performed by making a full-thickness vertical incision a few millimeters medial from the lateral canthus in both the upper and lower eyelids.
