= DLK =

DLK may refer to:

Transportation

- Dalkolha railway station, Indian Railways station code
- Dalston Kingsland railway station, England, National Rail station code
- Deccan Aviation (Lanka), ICAO airline code
- Detroit Lakes (Amtrak station), Minnesota, US, station code

Other

- De lyckliga kompisarna, a Swedish punk band
- Diffuse lamellar keratitis, a condition affecting eyesight
- MAP3K12, an enzyme
- Delta-like protein 1, DLK1
- DLK CASE
