= List of MeSH codes (C23) =

The following is a partial list of the "C" codes for Medical Subject Headings (MeSH), as defined by the United States National Library of Medicine (NLM).

This list continues the information at List of MeSH codes (C22). Codes following these are found at List of MeSH codes (D01). For other MeSH codes, see List of MeSH codes.

The source for this content is the set of 2006 MeSH Trees from the NLM.

== MeSH C23 – pathological conditions, signs and symptoms ==
=== MeSH C23.300 – pathological conditions, anatomical ===
==== MeSH C23.300.070 – atrophy ====
- MeSH C23.300.070.500 – muscular atrophy

==== MeSH C23.300.175 – calculi ====
- MeSH C23.300.175.350 – dental calculus
- MeSH C23.300.175.525 – gallstones
- MeSH C23.300.175.700 – salivary calculi
- MeSH C23.300.175.700.325 – salivary duct calculi
- MeSH C23.300.175.700.500 – salivary gland calculi
- MeSH C23.300.175.850 – urinary calculi
- MeSH C23.300.175.850.300 – bladder calculi
- MeSH C23.300.175.850.550 – kidney calculi
- MeSH C23.300.175.850.750 – ureteral calculi

==== MeSH C23.300.306 – cysts ====
- MeSH C23.300.306.500 – parovarian cyst

==== MeSH C23.300.415 – diverticulum ====
- MeSH C23.300.415.124 – diverticulum, colon
- MeSH C23.300.415.250 – diverticulum, esophageal
- MeSH C23.300.415.250.900 – zenker diverticulum
- MeSH C23.300.415.500 – diverticulum, stomach
- MeSH C23.300.415.750 – meckel diverticulum

==== MeSH C23.300.575 – fistula ====
- MeSH C23.300.575.150 – cutaneous fistula
- MeSH C23.300.575.185 – digestive system fistula
- MeSH C23.300.575.185.150 – biliary fistula
- MeSH C23.300.575.185.250 – esophageal fistula
- MeSH C23.300.575.185.250.725 – tracheoesophageal fistula
- MeSH C23.300.575.185.375 – gastric fistula
- MeSH C23.300.575.185.550 – intestinal fistula
- MeSH C23.300.575.185.550.600 – rectal fistula
- MeSH C23.300.575.185.550.600.650 – rectovaginal fistula
- MeSH C23.300.575.185.775 – pancreatic fistula
- MeSH C23.300.575.500 – oral fistula
- MeSH C23.300.575.500.275 – dental fistula
- MeSH C23.300.575.500.550 – oroantral fistula
- MeSH C23.300.575.500.775 – salivary gland fistula
- MeSH C23.300.575.687 – respiratory tract fistula
- MeSH C23.300.575.687.225 – bronchial fistula
- MeSH C23.300.575.825 – urinary fistula
- MeSH C23.300.575.825.250 – bladder fistula
- MeSH C23.300.575.825.250.775 – vesicovaginal fistula
- MeSH C23.300.575.925 – vaginal fistula
- MeSH C23.300.575.925.558 – rectovaginal fistula
- MeSH C23.300.575.925.816 – vesicovaginal fistula
- MeSH C23.300.575.950 – vascular fistula
- MeSH C23.300.575.950.150 – arterio-arterial fistula
- MeSH C23.300.575.950.250 – arteriovenous fistula

==== MeSH C23.300.707 – hernia ====
- MeSH C23.300.707.374 – hernia, abdominal
- MeSH C23.300.707.374.500 – gastroschisis
- MeSH C23.300.707.374.750 – hernia, femoral
- MeSH C23.300.707.374.875 – hernia, inguinal
- MeSH C23.300.707.374.937 – hernia, ventral
- MeSH C23.300.707.374.937.500 – hernia, umbilical
- MeSH C23.300.707.500 – hernia, diaphragmatic
- MeSH C23.300.707.500.233 – hernia, diaphragmatic, traumatic
- MeSH C23.300.707.500.467 – hernia, hiatal
- MeSH C23.300.707.937 – hernia, obturator

==== MeSH C23.300.775 – hypertrophy ====
- MeSH C23.300.775.250 – cardiomegaly
- MeSH C23.300.775.525 – hepatomegaly
- MeSH C23.300.775.750 – splenomegaly

==== MeSH C23.300.825 – polyps ====
- MeSH C23.300.825.411 – intestinal polyps
- MeSH C23.300.825.411.235 – colonic polyps
- MeSH C23.300.825.557 – nasal polyps

==== MeSH C23.300.970 – torsion ====
- MeSH C23.300.970.500 – intestinal volvulus

=== MeSH C23.550 – pathologic processes ===
==== MeSH C23.550.073 – arrhythmia ====
- MeSH C23.550.073.093 – arrhythmia, sinus
- MeSH C23.550.073.198 – atrial fibrillation
- MeSH C23.550.073.248 – atrial flutter
- MeSH C23.550.073.300 – bradycardia
- MeSH C23.550.073.325 – cardiac complexes, premature
- MeSH C23.550.073.325.050 – atrial premature complexes
- MeSH C23.550.073.325.800 – ventricular premature complexes
- MeSH C23.550.073.425 – heart block
- MeSH C23.550.073.425.025 – adams-stokes syndrome
- MeSH C23.550.073.425.100 – bundle-branch block
- MeSH C23.550.073.425.780 – sinoatrial block
- MeSH C23.550.073.670 – parasystole
- MeSH C23.550.073.845 – tachycardia
- MeSH C23.550.073.845.695 – tachycardia, paroxysmal
- MeSH C23.550.073.845.880 – tachycardia, supraventricular
- MeSH C23.550.073.845.880.025 – accelerated idioventricular rhythm
- MeSH C23.550.073.845.880.095 – tachycardia, atrioventricular nodal reentry
- MeSH C23.550.073.845.880.315 – tachycardia, ectopic atrial
- MeSH C23.550.073.845.880.320 – tachycardia, ectopic junctional
- MeSH C23.550.073.845.880.840 – tachycardia, sinoatrial nodal reentry
- MeSH C23.550.073.845.880.845 – tachycardia, sinus
- MeSH C23.550.073.845.940 – tachycardia, ventricular
- MeSH C23.550.073.845.940.700 – torsades de pointes
- MeSH C23.550.073.932 – ventricular fibrillation

==== MeSH C23.550.210 – chromosome aberrations ====
- MeSH C23.550.210.050 – aneuploidy
- MeSH C23.550.210.050.500 – monosomy
- MeSH C23.550.210.050.750 – trisomy
- MeSH C23.550.210.110 – chromosome instability
- MeSH C23.550.210.110.180 – chromosome fragility
- MeSH C23.550.210.170 – chromosome breakage
- MeSH C23.550.210.175 – chromosome deletion
- MeSH C23.550.210.420 – inversion, chromosome
- MeSH C23.550.210.430 – isochromosomes
- MeSH C23.550.210.570 – micronuclei, chromosome-defective
- MeSH C23.550.210.645 – nondisjunction, genetic
- MeSH C23.550.210.645.890 – uniparental disomy
- MeSH C23.550.210.760 – ring chromosomes
- MeSH C23.550.210.815 – sex chromosome aberrations
- MeSH C23.550.210.815.970 – xyy karyotype
- MeSH C23.550.210.870 – translocation, genetic
- MeSH C23.550.210.870.680 – philadelphia chromosome

==== MeSH C23.550.260 – death ====
- MeSH C23.550.260.095 – asphyxia
- MeSH C23.550.260.159 – brain death
- MeSH C23.550.260.224 – cadaver
- MeSH C23.550.260.224.617 – postmortem changes
- MeSH C23.550.260.224.617.236 – autolysis
- MeSH C23.550.260.224.617.839 – rigor mortis
- MeSH C23.550.260.322 – death, sudden
- MeSH C23.550.260.322.250 – death, sudden, cardiac
- MeSH C23.550.260.322.400 – sudden infant death
- MeSH C23.550.260.393 – drowning
- MeSH C23.550.260.440 – embryo loss
- MeSH C23.550.260.460 – fetal death
- MeSH C23.550.260.460.260 – fetal resorption

==== MeSH C23.550.288 – disease ====
- MeSH C23.550.288.500 – syndrome

==== MeSH C23.550.291 – disease attributes ====
- MeSH C23.550.291.125 – acute disease
- MeSH C23.550.291.250 – catastrophic illness
- MeSH C23.550.291.500 – chronic disease
- MeSH C23.550.291.562 – convalescence
- MeSH C23.550.291.625 – critical illness
- MeSH C23.550.291.656 – disease progression
- MeSH C23.550.291.687 – disease susceptibility
- MeSH C23.550.291.687.500 – genetic predisposition to disease
- MeSH C23.550.291.687.500.500 – anticipation, genetic
- MeSH C23.550.291.750 – diseases in twins
- MeSH C23.550.291.781 – emergencies
- MeSH C23.550.291.812 – facies
- MeSH C23.550.291.875 – iatrogenic disease
- MeSH C23.550.291.906 – rare diseases
- MeSH C23.550.291.937 – recurrence

==== MeSH C23.550.325 – emphysema ====
- MeSH C23.550.325.250 – mediastinal emphysema
- MeSH C23.550.325.500 – subcutaneous emphysema

==== MeSH C23.550.355 – fibrosis ====
- MeSH C23.550.355.500 – retroperitoneal fibrosis

==== MeSH C23.550.362 – genomic instability ====
- MeSH C23.550.362.180 – chromosomal instability
- MeSH C23.550.362.180.180 – chromosome fragility

==== MeSH C23.550.382 – granuloma ====
- MeSH C23.550.382.250 – eosinophilic granuloma
- MeSH C23.550.382.375 – granuloma annulare
- MeSH C23.550.382.437 – granuloma, foreign-body
- MeSH C23.550.382.468 – granuloma, giant cell
- MeSH C23.550.382.750 – granuloma, lethal midline
- MeSH C23.550.382.875 – granuloma, plasma cell
- MeSH C23.550.382.875.500 – granuloma, plasma cell, orbital
- MeSH C23.550.382.875.750 – granuloma, plasma cell, pulmonary
- MeSH C23.550.382.937 – granuloma, pyogenic
- MeSH C23.550.382.968 – granuloma, respiratory tract
- MeSH C23.550.382.968.500 – granuloma, laryngeal

==== MeSH C23.550.393 – growth disorders ====
- MeSH C23.550.393.225 – failure to thrive
- MeSH C23.550.393.450 – fetal growth retardation

==== MeSH C23.550.414 – hemorrhage ====
- MeSH C23.550.414.300 – blood loss, surgical
- MeSH C23.550.414.625 – ecchymosis
- MeSH C23.550.414.712 – epistaxis
- MeSH C23.550.414.756 – eye hemorrhage
- MeSH C23.550.414.756.300 – choroid hemorrhage
- MeSH C23.550.414.756.550 – hyphema
- MeSH C23.550.414.756.775 – retinal hemorrhage
- MeSH C23.550.414.756.887 – vitreous hemorrhage
- MeSH C23.550.414.788 – gastrointestinal hemorrhage
- MeSH C23.550.414.788.400 – hematemesis
- MeSH C23.550.414.788.600 – melena
- MeSH C23.550.414.788.700 – peptic ulcer hemorrhage
- MeSH C23.550.414.794 – hemarthrosis
- MeSH C23.550.414.817 – hematocele
- MeSH C23.550.414.838 – hematoma
- MeSH C23.550.414.838.349 – hematoma, epidural, cranial
- MeSH C23.550.414.838.355 – hematoma, epidural, spinal
- MeSH C23.550.414.838.700 – hematoma, subdural
- MeSH C23.550.414.838.700.100 – hematoma, subdural, acute
- MeSH C23.550.414.838.700.200 – hematoma, subdural, chronic
- MeSH C23.550.414.838.700.400 – hematoma, subdural, intracranial
- MeSH C23.550.414.838.700.700 – hematoma, subdural, spinal
- MeSH C23.550.414.849 – hematuria
- MeSH C23.550.414.864 – hemobilia
- MeSH C23.550.414.888 – hemoperitoneum
- MeSH C23.550.414.896 – hemoptysis
- MeSH C23.550.414.904 – hemothorax
- MeSH C23.550.414.904.500 – hemopneumothorax
- MeSH C23.550.414.913 – intracranial hemorrhages
- MeSH C23.550.414.913.100 – cerebral hemorrhage
- MeSH C23.550.414.913.100.200 – basal ganglia hemorrhage
- MeSH C23.550.414.913.100.200.500 – putaminal hemorrhage
- MeSH C23.550.414.913.400 – hematoma, epidural, cranial
- MeSH C23.550.414.913.700 – hematoma, subdural
- MeSH C23.550.414.913.700.100 – hematoma, subdural, acute
- MeSH C23.550.414.913.700.200 – hematoma, subdural, chronic
- MeSH C23.550.414.913.700.400 – hematoma, subdural, intracranial
- MeSH C23.550.414.913.850 – subarachnoid hemorrhage
- MeSH C23.550.414.922 – oral hemorrhage
- MeSH C23.550.414.922.500 – gingival hemorrhage
- MeSH C23.550.414.941 – postoperative hemorrhage
- MeSH C23.550.414.960 – retrobulbar hemorrhage
- MeSH C23.550.414.980 – shock, hemorrhagic
- MeSH C23.550.414.993 – uterine hemorrhage
- MeSH C23.550.414.993.700 – metrorrhagia
- MeSH C23.550.414.993.850 – postpartum hemorrhage

==== MeSH C23.550.429 – hyperbilirubinemia ====
- MeSH C23.550.429.249 – hyperbilirubinemia, neonatal
- MeSH C23.550.429.249.500 – jaundice, neonatal
- MeSH C23.550.429.500 – jaundice
- MeSH C23.550.429.500.755 – jaundice, obstructive
- MeSH C23.550.429.750 – kernicterus

==== MeSH C23.550.470 – inflammation ====
- MeSH C23.550.470.099 – acute-phase reaction
- MeSH C23.550.470.251 – foreign-body reaction
- MeSH C23.550.470.448 – neurogenic inflammation
- MeSH C23.550.470.640 – seroma
- MeSH C23.550.470.646 – serositis
- MeSH C23.550.470.756 – suppuration
- MeSH C23.550.470.756.100 – abscess
- MeSH C23.550.470.756.200 – cellulitis
- MeSH C23.550.470.756.305 – empyema

==== MeSH C23.550.505 – intraoperative complications ====
- MeSH C23.550.505.300 – blood loss, surgical

==== MeSH C23.550.568 – menstruation disturbances ====
- MeSH C23.550.568.500 – amenorrhea
- MeSH C23.550.568.750 – dysmenorrhea
- MeSH C23.550.568.875 – menorrhagia
- MeSH C23.550.568.937 – oligomenorrhea
- MeSH C23.550.568.968 – premenstrual syndrome

==== MeSH C23.550.589 – metaplasia ====
- MeSH C23.550.589.500 – neovascularization, pathologic
- MeSH C23.550.589.500.145 – choroidal neovascularization
- MeSH C23.550.589.500.725 – retinal neovascularization

==== MeSH C23.550.673 – multiple organ failure ====
- MeSH C23.550.673.500 – shock
- MeSH C23.550.673.500.275 – sepsis syndrome
- MeSH C23.550.673.500.550 – shock, cardiogenic
- MeSH C23.550.673.500.650 – shock, hemorrhagic
- MeSH C23.550.673.500.712 – shock, septic
- MeSH C23.550.673.500.775 – shock, surgical
- MeSH C23.550.673.500.888 – shock, traumatic

==== MeSH C23.550.717 – necrosis ====
- MeSH C23.550.717.182 – dental pulp necrosis
- MeSH C23.550.717.365 – fat necrosis
- MeSH C23.550.717.427 – gangrene
- MeSH C23.550.717.489 – infarction
- MeSH C23.550.717.732 – osteonecrosis
- MeSH C23.550.717.732.368 – femur head necrosis

==== MeSH C23.550.727 – neoplastic processes ====
- MeSH C23.550.727.045 – anaplasia
- MeSH C23.550.727.152 – cell transformation, neoplastic
- MeSH C23.550.727.152.110 – blast crisis
- MeSH C23.550.727.152.160 – cell transformation, viral
- MeSH C23.550.727.160 – cocarcinogenesis
- MeSH C23.550.727.645 – neoplasm invasiveness
- MeSH C23.550.727.645.500 – leukemic infiltration
- MeSH C23.550.727.650 – neoplasm metastasis
- MeSH C23.550.727.650.560 – lymphatic metastasis
- MeSH C23.550.727.650.645 – neoplasm circulating cells
- MeSH C23.550.727.650.830 – neoplasm seeding
- MeSH C23.550.727.650.895 – neoplasms, unknown primary
- MeSH C23.550.727.655 – neoplasm recurrence, local
- MeSH C23.550.727.670 – neoplasm regression, spontaneous
- MeSH C23.550.727.700 – neoplasm, residual

==== MeSH C23.550.737 – nerve degeneration ====
- MeSH C23.550.737.500 – retrograde degeneration
- MeSH C23.550.737.750 – wallerian degeneration

==== MeSH C23.550.751 – ossification, heterotopic ====
- MeSH C23.550.751.500 – ossification of posterior longitudinal ligament

==== MeSH C23.550.767 – postoperative complications ====
- MeSH C23.550.767.050 – afferent loop syndrome
- MeSH C23.550.767.400 – graft occlusion, vascular
- MeSH C23.550.767.600 – malignant hyperthermia
- MeSH C23.550.767.700 – pain, postoperative
- MeSH C23.550.767.775 – postcholecystectomy syndrome
- MeSH C23.550.767.812 – postgastrectomy syndromes
- MeSH C23.550.767.812.500 – dumping syndrome
- MeSH C23.550.767.850 – postoperative hemorrhage
- MeSH C23.550.767.859 – postoperative nausea and vomiting
- MeSH C23.550.767.863 – postpericardiotomy syndrome
- MeSH C23.550.767.865 – prosthesis failure
- MeSH C23.550.767.868 – prosthesis-related infections
- MeSH C23.550.767.877 – reperfusion injury
- MeSH C23.550.767.877.500 – myocardial reperfusion injury
- MeSH C23.550.767.879 – shock, surgical
- MeSH C23.550.767.882 – short bowel syndrome
- MeSH C23.550.767.887 – surgical wound dehiscence
- MeSH C23.550.767.925 – surgical wound infection

=== MeSH C23.888 – signs and symptoms ===
==== MeSH C23.888.119 – body temperature changes ====
- MeSH C23.888.119.344 – fever
- MeSH C23.888.119.344.345 – fever of unknown origin
- MeSH C23.888.119.344.672 – sweating sickness
- MeSH C23.888.119.565 – hypothermia

==== MeSH C23.888.144 – body weight ====
- MeSH C23.888.144.186 – birth weight
- MeSH C23.888.144.186.500 – fetal macrosomia
- MeSH C23.888.144.243 – body weight changes
- MeSH C23.888.144.243.926 – weight gain
- MeSH C23.888.144.243.963 – weight loss
- MeSH C23.888.144.243.963.500 – emaciation
- MeSH C23.888.144.243.963.500.500 – cachexia
- MeSH C23.888.144.300 – fetal weight
- MeSH C23.888.144.699 – overweight
- MeSH C23.888.144.699.500 – obesity
- MeSH C23.888.144.699.500.500 – obesity, morbid
- MeSH C23.888.144.828 – thinness

==== MeSH C23.888.277 – edema ====
- MeSH C23.888.277.395 – hydrops fetalis

==== MeSH C23.888.307 – eye manifestations ====
- MeSH C23.888.307.500 – eye hemorrhage

==== MeSH C23.888.592 – neurologic manifestations ====
- MeSH C23.888.592.162 – bladder, neurogenic
- MeSH C23.888.592.230 – cerebrospinal fluid otorrhea
- MeSH C23.888.592.264 – cerebrospinal fluid rhinorrhea
- MeSH C23.888.592.298 – decerebrate state
- MeSH C23.888.592.350 – dyskinesias
- MeSH C23.888.592.350.090 – ataxia
- MeSH C23.888.592.350.090.200 – cerebellar ataxia
- MeSH C23.888.592.350.090.600 – gait ataxia
- MeSH C23.888.592.350.110 – athetosis
- MeSH C23.888.592.350.200 – catalepsy
- MeSH C23.888.592.350.250 – chorea
- MeSH C23.888.592.350.300 – dystonia
- MeSH C23.888.592.350.300.800 – torticollis
- MeSH C23.888.592.350.350 – hyperkinesis
- MeSH C23.888.592.350.400 – hypokinesia
- MeSH C23.888.592.350.500 – myoclonus
- MeSH C23.888.592.350.600 – psychomotor agitation
- MeSH C23.888.592.350.600.500 – akathisia, drug-induced
- MeSH C23.888.592.350.675 – synkinesis
- MeSH C23.888.592.350.700 – tics
- MeSH C23.888.592.350.850 – tremor
- MeSH C23.888.592.413 – gait disorders, neurologic
- MeSH C23.888.592.413.400 – gait apraxia
- MeSH C23.888.592.413.450 – gait ataxia
- MeSH C23.888.592.544 – meningism
- MeSH C23.888.592.604 – neurobehavioral manifestations
- MeSH C23.888.592.604.080 – apraxias
- MeSH C23.888.592.604.115 – catatonia
- MeSH C23.888.592.604.150 – communication disorders
- MeSH C23.888.592.604.150.500 – language disorders
- MeSH C23.888.592.604.150.500.050 – agraphia
- MeSH C23.888.592.604.150.500.090 – anomic aphasia
- MeSH C23.888.592.604.150.500.300 – dyslexia
- MeSH C23.888.592.604.150.500.300.200 – Alexia (acquired dyslexia)
- MeSH C23.888.592.604.150.500.300.200.100 – alexia, pure
- MeSH C23.888.592.604.150.500.550 – language development disorders
- MeSH C23.888.592.604.150.500.800 – speech disorders
- MeSH C23.888.592.604.150.500.800.100 – aphasia
- MeSH C23.888.592.604.150.500.800.100.100 – expressive aphasia
- MeSH C23.888.592.604.150.500.800.100.111 – aphasia, conduction
- MeSH C23.888.592.604.150.500.800.100.155 – primary progressive aphasia
- MeSH C23.888.592.604.150.500.800.100.166 – receptive aphasia
- MeSH C23.888.592.604.150.500.800.150 – articulation disorders
- MeSH C23.888.592.604.150.500.800.150.200 – dysarthria
- MeSH C23.888.592.604.150.500.800.300 – echolalia
- MeSH C23.888.592.604.150.500.800.500 – mutism
- MeSH C23.888.592.604.150.500.800.750 – stuttering
- MeSH C23.888.592.604.150.550 – learning disorders
- MeSH C23.888.592.604.150.550.200 – dyslexia
- MeSH C23.888.592.604.150.550.200.500 – Alexia (acquired dyslexia)
- MeSH C23.888.592.604.339 – confusion
- MeSH C23.888.592.604.339.500 – delirium
- MeSH C23.888.592.604.359 – consciousness disorders
- MeSH C23.888.592.604.359.800 – unconsciousness
- MeSH C23.888.592.604.359.800.200 – coma
- MeSH C23.888.592.604.359.800.400 – persistent vegetative state
- MeSH C23.888.592.604.359.800.600 – syncope
- MeSH C23.888.592.604.359.800.600.500 – syncope, vasovagal
- MeSH C23.888.592.604.529 – memory disorders
- MeSH C23.888.592.604.529.100 – amnesia
- MeSH C23.888.592.604.529.100.075 – amnesia, anterograde
- MeSH C23.888.592.604.529.100.150 – amnesia, retrograde
- MeSH C23.888.592.604.529.100.800 – amnesia, transient global
- MeSH C23.888.592.604.529.400 – korsakoff syndrome
- MeSH C23.888.592.604.646 – mental retardation
- MeSH C23.888.592.604.764 – perceptual disorders
- MeSH C23.888.592.604.764.100 – agnosia
- MeSH C23.888.592.604.764.100.300 – gerstmann syndrome
- MeSH C23.888.592.604.764.100.650 – prosopagnosia
- MeSH C23.888.592.604.764.200 – auditory perceptual disorders
- MeSH C23.888.592.604.764.300 – hallucinations
- MeSH C23.888.592.604.764.400 – illusions
- MeSH C23.888.592.604.764.700 – phantom limb
- MeSH C23.888.592.604.882 – psychomotor disorders
- MeSH C23.888.592.604.882.350 – apraxias
- MeSH C23.888.592.604.882.350.200 – apraxia, ideomotor
- MeSH C23.888.592.604.882.350.600 – gait apraxia
- MeSH C23.888.592.604.882.700 – psychomotor agitation
- MeSH C23.888.592.608 – neuromuscular manifestations
- MeSH C23.888.592.608.250 – fasciculation
- MeSH C23.888.592.608.500 – muscle cramp
- MeSH C23.888.592.608.550 – muscle hypertonia
- MeSH C23.888.592.608.550.500 – muscle rigidity
- MeSH C23.888.592.608.550.550 – muscle spasticity
- MeSH C23.888.592.608.575 – muscle hypotonia
- MeSH C23.888.592.608.593 – muscle weakness
- MeSH C23.888.592.608.612 – muscular atrophy
- MeSH C23.888.592.608.650 – myokymia
- MeSH C23.888.592.608.700 – myotonia
- MeSH C23.888.592.608.750 – spasm
- MeSH C23.888.592.608.750.400 – hemifacial spasm
- MeSH C23.888.592.608.750.700 – trismus
- MeSH C23.888.592.608.875 – tetany
- MeSH C23.888.592.612 – pain
- MeSH C23.888.592.612.107 – back pain
- MeSH C23.888.592.612.107.400 – low back pain
- MeSH C23.888.592.612.330 – facial pain
- MeSH C23.888.592.612.441 – headache
- MeSH C23.888.592.612.490 – labor pain
- MeSH C23.888.592.612.540 – metatarsalgia
- MeSH C23.888.592.612.553 – neck pain
- MeSH C23.888.592.612.664 – neuralgia
- MeSH C23.888.592.612.664.550 – neuralgia, postherpetic
- MeSH C23.888.592.612.664.800 – sciatica
- MeSH C23.888.592.612.776 – pain, intractable
- MeSH C23.888.592.636 – paralysis
- MeSH C23.888.592.636.214 – facial paralysis
- MeSH C23.888.592.636.263 – gastroparesis
- MeSH C23.888.592.636.312 – hemiplegia
- MeSH C23.888.592.636.447 – ophthalmoplegia
- MeSH C23.888.592.636.447.511 – ophthalmoplegia, chronic progressive external
- MeSH C23.888.592.636.447.690 – supranuclear palsy, progressive
- MeSH C23.888.592.636.637 – paraplegia
- MeSH C23.888.592.636.637.300 – brown-sequard syndrome
- MeSH C23.888.592.636.711 – pseudobulbar palsy
- MeSH C23.888.592.636.786 – quadriplegia
- MeSH C23.888.592.636.812 – respiratory paralysis
- MeSH C23.888.592.636.943 – vocal cord paralysis
- MeSH C23.888.592.643 – paresis
- MeSH C23.888.592.643.500 – paraparesis
- MeSH C23.888.592.643.500.500 – paraparesis, spastic
- MeSH C23.888.592.700 – psychophysiologic disorders
- MeSH C23.888.592.708 – pupil disorders
- MeSH C23.888.592.708.150 – anisocoria
- MeSH C23.888.592.708.362 – miosis
- MeSH C23.888.592.708.362.500 – horner syndrome
- MeSH C23.888.592.708.575 – tonic pupil
- MeSH C23.888.592.717 – reflex, abnormal
- MeSH C23.888.592.717.400 – reflex, babinski
- MeSH C23.888.592.742 – seizures
- MeSH C23.888.592.763 – sensation disorders
- MeSH C23.888.592.763.237 – dizziness
- MeSH C23.888.592.763.393 – hearing disorders
- MeSH C23.888.592.763.393.341 – hearing loss
- MeSH C23.888.592.763.393.341.186 – deafness
- MeSH C23.888.592.763.393.341.374 – hearing loss, bilateral
- MeSH C23.888.592.763.393.341.562 – hearing loss, conductive
- MeSH C23.888.592.763.393.341.750 – hearing loss, functional
- MeSH C23.888.592.763.393.341.812 – hearing loss, high-frequency
- MeSH C23.888.592.763.393.341.849 – hearing loss, mixed conductive-sensorineural
- MeSH C23.888.592.763.393.341.887 – hearing loss, sensorineural
- MeSH C23.888.592.763.393.341.887.432 – hearing loss, central
- MeSH C23.888.592.763.393.341.887.460 – hearing loss, noise-induced
- MeSH C23.888.592.763.393.341.887.772 – presbycusis
- MeSH C23.888.592.763.393.341.887.886 – usher syndromes
- MeSH C23.888.592.763.393.341.900 – hearing loss, sudden
- MeSH C23.888.592.763.393.341.950 – hearing loss, unilateral
- MeSH C23.888.592.763.393.505 – hyperacusis
- MeSH C23.888.592.763.393.670 – tinnitus
- MeSH C23.888.592.763.550 – olfaction disorders
- MeSH C23.888.592.763.770 – somatosensory disorders
- MeSH C23.888.592.763.770.400 – hyperalgesia
- MeSH C23.888.592.763.770.450 – hyperesthesia
- MeSH C23.888.592.763.770.500 – hypesthesia
- MeSH C23.888.592.763.770.875 – paresthesia
- MeSH C23.888.592.763.861 – taste disorders
- MeSH C23.888.592.763.861.184 – ageusia
- MeSH C23.888.592.763.861.479 – dysgeusia
- MeSH C23.888.592.763.941 – vision disorders
- MeSH C23.888.592.763.941.073 – amblyopia
- MeSH C23.888.592.763.941.162 – blindness
- MeSH C23.888.592.763.941.162.125 – amaurosis fugax
- MeSH C23.888.592.763.941.162.250 – blindness, cortical
- MeSH C23.888.592.763.941.256 – color vision defects
- MeSH C23.888.592.763.941.339 – diplopia
- MeSH C23.888.592.763.941.512 – hemianopsia
- MeSH C23.888.592.763.941.661 – photophobia
- MeSH C23.888.592.763.941.811 – scotoma
- MeSH C23.888.592.763.941.848 – vision, low
- MeSH C23.888.592.796 – sleep disorders
- MeSH C23.888.592.796.772 – sleep deprivation
- MeSH C23.888.592.958 – vertigo
- MeSH C23.888.592.979 – voice disorders
- MeSH C23.888.592.979.100 – aphonia
- MeSH C23.888.592.979.550 – hoarseness

==== MeSH C23.888.619 – oral manifestations ====
- MeSH C23.888.619.500 – oral hemorrhage

==== MeSH C23.888.646 – pain ====
- MeSH C23.888.646.100 – abdominal pain
- MeSH C23.888.646.100.200 – abdomen, acute
- MeSH C23.888.646.100.600 – colic
- MeSH C23.888.646.130 – arthralgia
- MeSH C23.888.646.130.700 – shoulder pain
- MeSH C23.888.646.172 – back pain
- MeSH C23.888.646.172.500 – low back pain
- MeSH C23.888.646.215 – chest pain
- MeSH C23.888.646.215.500 – angina pectoris
- MeSH C23.888.646.215.500.150 – angina, unstable
- MeSH C23.888.646.215.500.150.150 – angina pectoris, variant
- MeSH C23.888.646.386 – earache
- MeSH C23.888.646.429 – facial pain
- MeSH C23.888.646.429.800 – toothache
- MeSH C23.888.646.451 – flank pain
- MeSH C23.888.646.473 – glossalgia
- MeSH C23.888.646.487 – headache
- MeSH C23.888.646.492 – labor pain
- MeSH C23.888.646.498 – metatarsalgia
- MeSH C23.888.646.501 – neck pain
- MeSH C23.888.646.508 – neuralgia
- MeSH C23.888.646.508.550 – neuralgia, postherpetic
- MeSH C23.888.646.508.800 – sciatica
- MeSH C23.888.646.515 – pain, intractable
- MeSH C23.888.646.530 – pain, postoperative
- MeSH C23.888.646.587 – pelvic pain
- MeSH C23.888.646.587.500 – dysmenorrhea
- MeSH C23.888.646.793 – shoulder pain

==== MeSH C23.888.821 – signs and symptoms, digestive ====
- MeSH C23.888.821.030 – abdominal pain
- MeSH C23.888.821.030.249 – abdomen, acute
- MeSH C23.888.821.030.500 – colic
- MeSH C23.888.821.061 – aerophagy
- MeSH C23.888.821.108 – anorexia
- MeSH C23.888.821.150 – constipation
- MeSH C23.888.821.192 – coprophagia
- MeSH C23.888.821.214 – diarrhea
- MeSH C23.888.821.214.500 – diarrhea, infantile
- MeSH C23.888.821.236 – dyspepsia
- MeSH C23.888.821.266 – encopresis
- MeSH C23.888.821.297 – eructation
- MeSH C23.888.821.360 – flatulence
- MeSH C23.888.821.414 – gagging
- MeSH C23.888.821.475 – halitosis
- MeSH C23.888.821.525 – heartburn
- MeSH C23.888.821.578 – hiccup
- MeSH C23.888.821.645 – hyperphagia
- MeSH C23.888.821.645.500 – bulimia
- MeSH C23.888.821.712 – nausea
- MeSH C23.888.821.712.700 – postoperative nausea and vomiting
- MeSH C23.888.821.937 – vomiting
- MeSH C23.888.821.937.019 – hematemesis
- MeSH C23.888.821.937.049 – morning sickness
- MeSH C23.888.821.937.049.500 – hyperemesis gravidarum
- MeSH C23.888.821.937.059 – postoperative nausea and vomiting
- MeSH C23.888.821.937.080 – vomiting, anticipatory

==== MeSH C23.888.852 – signs and symptoms, respiratory ====
- MeSH C23.888.852.079 – anoxia
- MeSH C23.888.852.079.189 – altitude sickness
- MeSH C23.888.852.079.367 – anoxemia
- MeSH C23.888.852.130 – apnea
- MeSH C23.888.852.227 – cheyne-stokes respiration
- MeSH C23.888.852.293 – cough
- MeSH C23.888.852.371 – dyspnea
- MeSH C23.888.852.371.396 – dyspnea, paroxysmal
- MeSH C23.888.852.430 – hemoptysis
- MeSH C23.888.852.490 – hoarseness
- MeSH C23.888.852.544 – hypercapnia
- MeSH C23.888.852.567 – hyperoxia
- MeSH C23.888.852.591 – hyperventilation
- MeSH C23.888.852.614 – hypocapnia
- MeSH C23.888.852.638 – hypoventilation
- MeSH C23.888.852.761 – mouth breathing
- MeSH C23.888.852.779 – respiratory sounds
- MeSH C23.888.852.779.850 – snoring
- MeSH C23.888.852.889 – sneezing

==== MeSH C23.888.885 – skin manifestations ====
- MeSH C23.888.885.250 – cafe-au-lait spots
- MeSH C23.888.885.312 – ecchymosis
- MeSH C23.888.885.375 – jaundice
- MeSH C23.888.885.375.500 – jaundice, obstructive
- MeSH C23.888.885.500 – pallor
- MeSH C23.888.885.625 – pruritus
- MeSH C23.888.885.625.500 – tinea pedis
- MeSH C23.888.885.687 – purpura

==== MeSH C23.888.942 – urological manifestations ====
- MeSH C23.888.942.200 – anuria
- MeSH C23.888.942.400 – oliguria
- MeSH C23.888.942.600 – polyuria

==== MeSH C23.888.971 – virilism ====
- MeSH C23.888.971.468 – hirsutism

The list continues at List of MeSH codes (D01).
