= Electromechanical reshaping =

Experimental surgical technique

Electromechanical Reshaping (EMR) is an experimental technique designed to reshape soft tissue, such as cartilage and the cornea of the eye, using an electric current. EMR may have applications in otolaryngology, plastic surgery, orthopedics, and vision, but is currently confined to testing on isolated tissues; it has yet to demonstrate its utility in animals.

== History ==
Electromechanical reshaping was conceptualized in the early 2000s as a less invasive alternative to invasive cartilage surgery. EMR was discovered serendipitously by UC Irvine's Brian Wong and colleagues while they were exploring living tissues as moldable materials and reported in 2006. Subsequent research refined the technique, optimizing parameters such as voltage, current duration, and electrode materials to minimize tissue damage while maximizing reshaping efficacy. By 2010, preclinical studies on porcine and human cartilage models confirmed EMR’s potential for clinical applications, particularly in facial reconstructive surgery. The technology gained attention for its ability to address aesthetic and functional issues, such as correcting deviated septa or reshaping auricular cartilage, without the scarring associated with traditional methods.

The technique was refined in collaboration with Michael Hill. Initial studies were published in 2023. They tested EMR on 12 ex vivo rabbit myopic eyeballs, successfully reshaping 10. As of summer 2025, EMR had not been tested in vivo.

== Mechanism of action ==
The mechanism of EMR involves a combination of electrochemical, biomechanical, and cellular processes:

- Electrochemical Reactions: When a low-level DC current (typically 3–6 volts) is applied through electrodes, it triggers redox reactions. These reactions alter the pH and ion distribution within the tissue matrix, particularly around the negatively charged proteoglycans. The resulting changes in charge interactions weaken the matrix’s structural integrity, making it more pliable.
- Mechanical Stress: A mold or clamp applies controlled mechanical force to deform the tissue into the desired shape. The softened matrix, influenced by the electric field, allows the tissue to conform to the mold without fracturing. The stress must be carefully calibrated to avoid over-compression or tissue damage.
- Tissue Stabilization: After the current and mechanical force are removed, the tissue retains its new shape and the matrix stabilizes. This is partly due to stress relaxation and the reformation of intermolecular bonds. Over weeks, cellular remodeling by chondrocytes may further reinforce the new configuration.
- Minimal Thermal Effect: Unlike laser reshaping, which relies on heat to denature collagen, EMR operates at low voltages, avoiding significant thermal injury. A 2011 study reported that EMR maintains tissue viability, with minimal necrosis compared to thermal methods.
- Parameters include voltage, application time, and application mechanism (e.g., needles). One cartilage study reported a 3V threshold for voltage and time above which the retention of bend angle became statistically significant. Above 3V, shape retention initially increased with application time and then plateaued. Shape retention was greatest at 6V without a rise in temperature.

== Applications ==
=== Cornea ===
ERM is a potential alternative to traditional vision correction methods such as LASIK surgery. The technique is intended to correct myopia (nearsightedness) or hyperopia (farsightedness). In contrast to LASIK, the procedure takes less than one minute and avoids lasers and blades.

The cornea is the surface of the front of the eye. It is the primary lens for focusing incoming light onto the retina. Normally, it is clear and dome-shaped. It is composed of tightly packed collagen fibers. Its shape and structural integrity are maintained by an arrangement of ions and proteins. A large fraction of the population is myopic.

When its curvature becomes irregular, refractive errors such as myopia and hyperopia can occur.

Electromechanical reshaping has a wide range of potential applications, primarily in reconstructive and cosmetic surgery:

=== Otolaryngology ===
- Nasal Reconstruction: EMR is used to correct deviated septa, a common cause of breathing difficulties, by reshaping nasal cartilage without invasive surgery.
- Rhinoplasty: EMR offers a scarless alternative for aesthetic nose reshaping, addressing issues like dorsal humps or tip refinement. Its precision is particularly valuable for patients seeking subtle changes.

=== Plastic Surgery ===
Applying EMR to cartilage grafts in plastic surgery was reported to quickly increase flexibility without heat generation. Costal margin rib is a major reservoir of cartilage tissue that can be repurposed for tasks such as facial reconstruction, particularly when septal or auricular cartilage has been depleted. Reshaping was reported to be a positive function of voltage and application time.

- Auricular Reconstruction: EMR can reshape ear cartilage to correct deformities like prominent ears (otoplasty) or microtia. A 2016 study reported EMR’s effectiveness in reshaping porcine auricular cartilage, with stable results over months.
- Facial Contouring: Potential applications include reshaping cartilage in the chin or jawline, though these are still experimental.

== Challenges ==
Despite its promise, EMR faces several challenges:

- Tissue Damage Risk: Excessive voltage or prolonged current can cause localized necrosis or pH-related damage. A 2013 study noted mild chondrocyte loss at higher voltages.
- Long-Term Stability: While preclinical studies show shape retention for months, long-term human data (beyond 5–10 years) is limited, raising questions about durability.
- Application Specificity: EMR is most effective on thin cartilage (e.g., nasal, auricular) but less so on thicker, load-bearing cartilage (e.g., knee), limiting orthopedic use.
- Regulatory Hurdles: As of 2025, EMR remains in preclinical trials for most applications.
- Technical Expertise: Surgeons require training to optimize voltage, duration, and mechanical force, as improper application can lead to suboptimal results or tissue injury.

== See also ==
- LASIK
- Cataract surgery
