= Corneal neuralgia =

Spectrum of disorders

- Other names: Ocular neuropathic pain, keratoneuralgia, burning eye syndrome, neuropathic dry eye
- Specialty: Ophthalmology

Corneal neuralgia, also called ocular neuropathic pain, is a spectrum of disorders of ocular pain which are caused by damage or disease affecting the nerves. Ocular neuropathic pain is frequently associated with damaged or dysfunctional corneal nerves, but the condition can also be caused by peripheral or centralized sensitization. The condition shares some characteristics with somatic neuropathic pain in that it is similarly associated with abnormal sensations (dysesthesia) or pain from normally non-painful stimuli (allodynia), but until recent years has been poorly understood by the medical community, and frequently dismissed by ophthalmologists who were not trained to identify neuropathic pain as a source of unexplained eye pain beyond objective findings noted on slit-lamp examination.

This condition is frequently associated with dry eye disease since sensations of dryness and burning in the eye are a common symptom of both neuropathic eye pain and dry eye, but ocular neuropathic pain should be considered as a disease in its own right. Neuropathic pain patients may have little or no signs of aqueous dry eye, and frequently respond poorly to conventional dry eye treatments. Unlike conventional dry eye disease, there may be little or no sign of ocular surface damage, (the condition is sometimes referred to as "pain without stain"), however patients may also have symptoms of dry eye but with pain symptoms that are out of proportion to the dry eye presentation.

The experience of painful sensations in this condition can vary widely, reflecting a variety of causal factors such as: types of noxious stimuli causing insult to ocular surface nociceptors, the types of corneal sensory receptors affected, (including cold-sensing thermoreceptors, mechanoreceptors, and polymodal receptors), the extent of the inflammatory responses, and the type or types of disorders and damage affecting the nervous system.

== Signs and symptoms ==
Symptoms of ocular neuropathic pain can range from devastating, unrelenting eye pain and severe sensitivity to light (photophobia) in the worst cases, to mild hyperalgesia or dysesthesia such as a sensation of dryness, stinging, or foreign body in milder cases. Mild neuropathic pain symptoms can appear similar to clinical symptoms of aqueous dry eye which can impede proper diagnosis. Sensations and levels of pain can vary depending on the source or sources of the maladaptive signals (eg. abnormal axonal regeneration, peripheral sensitization, etc). One or both eyes may be affected, with varying degrees of severity.

The sensation of pain has been described by patients as "burning eyes", "terrible, unrelenting pain", a feeling of "a knife in my eye" or "paper cuts". The pain is usually described as being located in and around the eye, but can progress to the surrounding areas of the face and head. A signature characteristic of ocular neuropathic pain is inadequately explained levels of severe, constant pain in relation to little or no sign of ocular surface damage. Providers have reported their patients describing excruciating, consistently high levels of pain, or even requesting surgical removal of the painful eye.

Cases of severe, refractory pain and related symptoms attributed to this condition have been described in medical publications. The severe and constant nature of the pain, as well as the difficulty in effective pain management are characteristics of severe cases. Oxford Academic described a case of a post-Lasik corneal neuralgia patient whose pain was refractory to years of aggressive ophthalmological and pain management treatments, and required surgical intervention to manage the constant, debilitating pain. Prior to surgery, the patient reported daily pain which varied from 6 to 10 on a numerical rating scale (where 0 signifies no pain and 10 the worst imaginable pain), depending on environmental factors. The pain was described as sharp, non-radiating, felt like paper cuts in both eyes, and the pain had persisted for 7 years prior to successful treatment with an implanted intrathecal pain pump.

=== Comorbid conditions ===
A number of comorbid conditions have been identified which may predispose the patient to ocular neuropathic pain, including peripheral neuropathic pain, fibromyalgia, and Sjogren's Syndrome.

== Causes ==
Ocular neuropathic pain is a spectrum of disorders, the various clinical expressions of this disease are believed to reflect the complexity of overlapping networks of interactive pathogenetic cascades. One or more causes may be shown to be present in a single patient through clinical examinations.

=== Corneal sensitization and evaporative hyperalgesia ===
Corneal sensitization and evaporative hyperalgesia occur as a result of trauma and environmental stress, the cornea has the highest density of nociceptors of any tissue in the body, and can become more sensitive to normal environmental stimuli. Predisposing factors to developing neuropathic pain include refractive surgeries (such as LASIK or LASEK) where it can occur as a result of aberrant nerve regeneration, tear dysfunction, blepharoplasty, excessive UV light exposure, chemical injury, and trigeminal zoster.

=== Peripheral injuries and central sensitization ===
Peripheral injuries trigger complex changes in the central nociceptive system which can lead to central sensitization that enhances the sensitivity and responsiveness of the brain regions involved in sensory processing. In some cases, these physiological responses progress to neuropathic centralized pain.

== Treatments ==
Because the nerve damage and inflammation often originates in the ocular surface, conventional dry eye treatments including artificial tears are often the first line of treatment. A nonfenestrated scleral lens such as the Boston Ocular Surface Prosthesis (PROSE) can insulate the corneal surface from unwanted stimuli. Gabapentin and other neuropathic pain medications may be used to blunt sensory nerve stimulation or the perception of nerve stimulation.

Recent publications have shown that neuro-regenerative therapies such as 20% autologous serum eye drops and topical nerve growth factor, and anti-inflammatory agents that minimize nerve injury and sensitization from uncontrolled inflammation (e.g., corticosteroids) can be effective in patients that have not responded to prior treatments. For severe refractory ocular neuropathic pain cases where conservative treatments have proven ineffective, Intrathecal Targeted Drug Delivery with an implanted intrathecal pain pump has been used to successfully treat pain symptoms.
