= List of MeSH codes (C22) =

The following is a partial list of the "C" codes for Medical Subject Headings (MeSH), as defined by the United States National Library of Medicine (NLM).

This list continues the information at List of MeSH codes (C21). Codes following these are found at List of MeSH codes (C23). For other MeSH codes, see List of MeSH codes.

The source for this content is the set of 2006 MeSH Trees from the NLM.

== MeSH C22 – animal diseases ==
=== MeSH C22.021 – abortion, veterinary ===
- MeSH C22.021.322 – brucellosis, bovine

=== MeSH C22.131 – bird diseases ===
- MeSH C22.131.094 – avian leukosis
- MeSH C22.131.321 – fowlpox
- MeSH C22.131.450 – influenza in birds
- MeSH C22.131.498 – malaria, avian
- MeSH C22.131.546 – marek disease
- MeSH C22.131.630 – newcastle disease
- MeSH C22.131.728 – poultry diseases
- MeSH C22.131.728.250 – enteritis, transmissible, of turkeys
- MeSH C22.131.728.450 – influenza in birds
- MeSH C22.131.728.650 – poult enteritis mortality syndrome
- MeSH C22.131.800 – sarcoma, avian
- MeSH C22.131.921 – tuberculosis, avian

=== MeSH C22.180 – cat diseases ===
- MeSH C22.180.350 – feline acquired immunodeficiency syndrome
- MeSH C22.180.440 – feline infectious peritonitis
- MeSH C22.180.460 – feline panleukopenia
- MeSH C22.180.500 – leukemia, feline

=== MeSH C22.196 – cattle diseases ===
- MeSH C22.196.090 – bovine respiratory disease complex
- MeSH C22.196.090.600 – pasteurellosis, pneumonic
- MeSH C22.196.090.660 – pneumonia, atypical interstitial, of cattle
- MeSH C22.196.090.675 – pneumonia of calves, enzootic
- MeSH C22.196.106 – bovine virus diarrhea-mucosal disease
- MeSH C22.196.148 – brucellosis, bovine
- MeSH C22.196.250 – encephalopathy, bovine spongiform
- MeSH C22.196.260 – enzootic bovine leukosis
- MeSH C22.196.274 – ephemeral fever
- MeSH C22.196.339 – freemartinism
- MeSH C22.196.400 – hemorrhagic syndrome, bovine
- MeSH C22.196.429 – infectious bovine rhinotracheitis
- MeSH C22.196.497 – lumpy skin disease
- MeSH C22.196.540 – malignant catarrh
- MeSH C22.196.581 – mastitis, bovine
- MeSH C22.196.831 – theileriasis
- MeSH C22.196.888 – trypanosomiasis, bovine
- MeSH C22.196.927 – tuberculosis, bovine
- MeSH C22.196.963 – white heifer disease

=== MeSH C22.268 – dog diseases ===
- MeSH C22.268.265 – distemper
- MeSH C22.268.465 – hepatitis, infectious canine
- MeSH C22.268.485 – hip dysplasia, canine

=== MeSH C22.331 – erysipelothrix infections ===
- MeSH C22.331.693 – swine erysipelas

=== MeSH C22.362 – fish diseases ===
- MeSH C22.362.224 – furunculosis
- MeSH C22.362.450 – hemorrhagic septicemia, viral

=== MeSH C22.467 – hepatitis, animal ===
- MeSH C22.467.435 – hepatitis, viral, animal
- MeSH C22.467.435.442 – hepatitis, infectious canine
- MeSH C22.467.435.812 – rift valley fever

=== MeSH C22.488 – horse diseases ===
- MeSH C22.488.088 – african horse sickness
- MeSH C22.488.304 – equine infectious anemia
- MeSH C22.488.409 – glanders
- MeSH C22.488.861 – strongyle infections, equine

=== MeSH C22.595 – muscular dystrophy, animal ===
- MeSH C22.595.740 – white muscle disease

=== MeSH C22.674 – parasitic diseases, animal ===
- MeSH C22.674.377 – helminthiasis, animal
- MeSH C22.674.377.315 – dictyocaulus infections
- MeSH C22.674.377.320 – dirofilariasis
- MeSH C22.674.377.444 – fascioloidiasis
- MeSH C22.674.377.656 – monieziasis
- MeSH C22.674.377.820 – setariasis
- MeSH C22.674.377.840 – strongyle infections, equine
- MeSH C22.674.377.868 – toxocariasis
- MeSH C22.674.710 – protozoan infections, animal
- MeSH C22.674.710.122 – babesiosis
- MeSH C22.674.710.235 – cryptosporidiosis
- MeSH C22.674.710.367 – dourine
- MeSH C22.674.710.735 – theileriasis
- MeSH C22.674.710.817 – toxoplasmosis, animal
- MeSH C22.674.710.896 – trypanosomiasis, bovine

=== MeSH C22.735 – primate diseases ===
- MeSH C22.735.050 – ape diseases
- MeSH C22.735.500 – monkey diseases
- MeSH C22.735.500.500 – marburg virus disease
- MeSH C22.735.500.850 – simian acquired immunodeficiency syndrome
- MeSH C22.735.750 – monkeypox

=== MeSH C22.795 – rodent diseases ===
- MeSH C22.795.239 – ectromelia, infectious
- MeSH C22.795.600 – monkeypox
- MeSH C22.795.650 – murine acquired immunodeficiency syndrome

=== MeSH C22.836 – sheep diseases ===
- MeSH C22.836.120 – bluetongue
- MeSH C22.836.160 – border disease
- MeSH C22.836.259 – ecthyma, contagious
- MeSH C22.836.435 – louping ill
- MeSH C22.836.583 – nairobi sheep disease
- MeSH C22.836.660 – pneumonia, progressive interstitial, of sheep
- MeSH C22.836.715 – pulmonary adenomatosis, ovine
- MeSH C22.836.799 – scrapie
- MeSH C22.836.886 – swayback
- MeSH C22.836.900 – visna

=== MeSH C22.905 – swine diseases ===
- MeSH C22.905.072 – african swine fever
- MeSH C22.905.170 – classical swine fever
- MeSH C22.905.260 – edema disease of swine
- MeSH C22.905.323 – encephalomyelitis, enzootic porcine
- MeSH C22.905.382 – epidermitis, exudative, of swine
- MeSH C22.905.469 – gastroenteritis, transmissible, of swine
- MeSH C22.905.626 – pneumonia of swine, mycoplasmal
- MeSH C22.905.700 – porcine reproductive and respiratory syndrome
- MeSH C22.905.832 – swine erysipelas
- MeSH C22.905.850 – swine vesicular disease
- MeSH C22.905.927 – vesicular exanthema of swine

=== MeSH C22.969 – zoonoses ===
The list continues at List of MeSH codes (C23).
