= Subconjunctival bleeding =

Bleeding within the whites of the eye

- Other names: Subconjunctival hemorrhage, hyposphagma
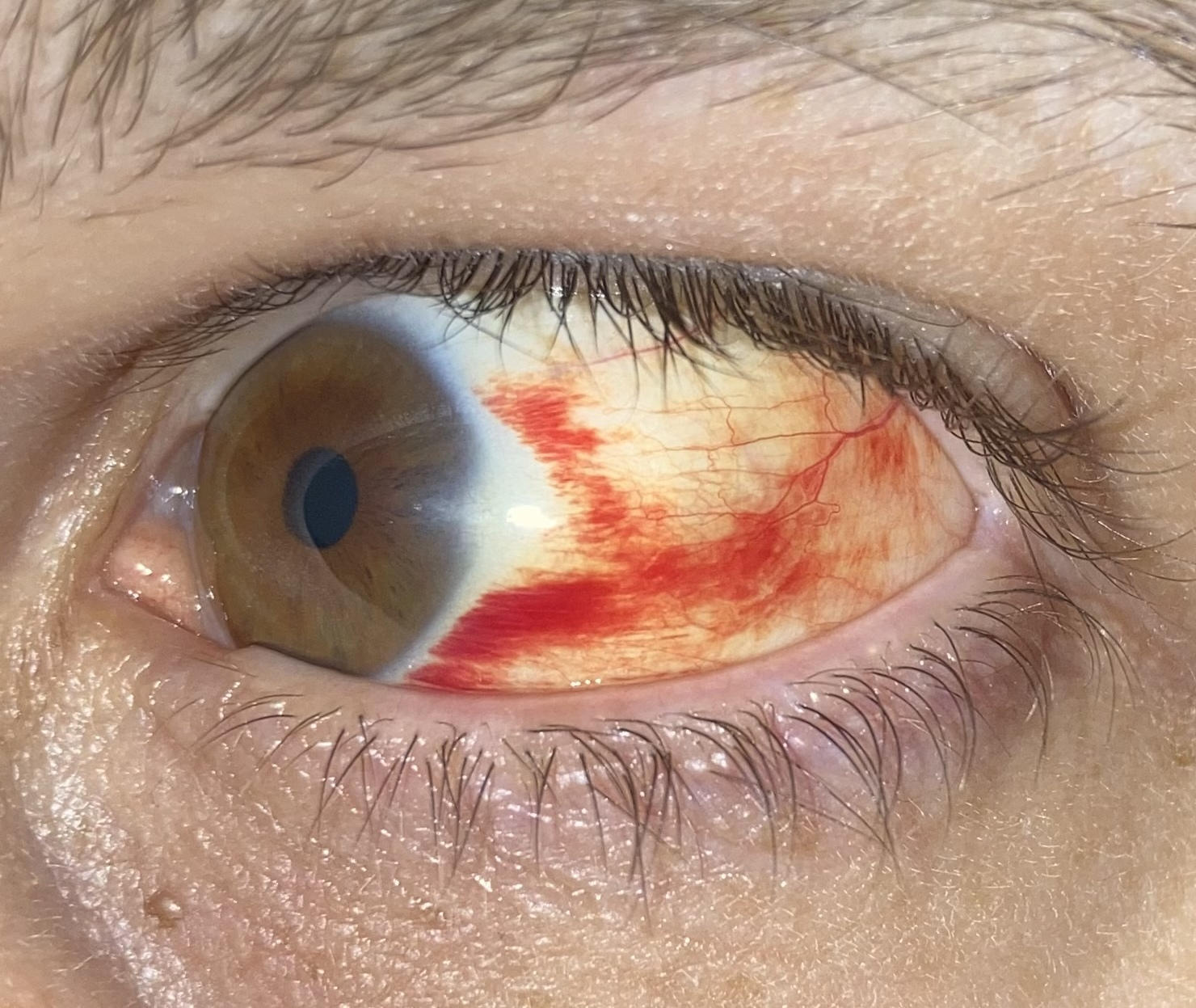
- Subconjunctival hemorrhage resulting in red coloration of the white of the eye
- Specialty: Ophthalmology, Optometry
- Symptoms: Red spot over whites of the eye, little to no pain
- Complications: None
- Duration: One to two weeks
- Types: Traumatic, spontaneous
- Causes: Coughing, vomiting, direct injury
- Risk factors: High blood pressure, diabetes, older age
- Diagnostic method: Based on appearance
- Differential diagnosis: Open globe, retrobulbar hematoma, conjunctivitis, pterygium
- Treatment: No specific treatment
- Medication: Artificial tears
- Prognosis: Good, 10% risk of recurrence
- Frequency: Common

Subconjunctival bleeding, also known as subconjunctival hemorrhage or subconjunctival haemorrhage, is bleeding from a small blood vessel over the whites of the eye. It results in a red spot in the white of the eye. There is generally little to no pain and vision is not affected. Generally only one eye is affected.

Causes can include coughing, vomiting, heavy lifting, straining during acute constipation or the act of "bearing down" during childbirth, as these activities can increase the blood pressure in the vascular systems supplying the conjunctiva. Other causes include blunt or penetrating trauma to the eye. Risk factors include hypertension, diabetes, old age, and blood thinners. Subconjunctival bleeding occurs in about 2% of newborns following a vaginal delivery. The blood accumulates between the conjunctiva and the episclera. Diagnosis is generally based on the appearance of the conjunctiva.

The condition is relatively common, and both sexes are affected equally. Spontaneous bleeding occurs more commonly over the age of 50 while the traumatic type occurs more often in young males. Generally no specific treatment is required and the condition resolves over two to three weeks. Artificial tears may be used to alleviate irritation.

== Signs and symptoms ==
Subconjunctival bleeding initially appears bright red underneath the transparent bulbar conjunctiva. Later, the bleeding may spread and become green or yellow as the hemoglobin is metabolized. It usually disappears within two weeks. The affected eye may feel dry, rough, or scratchy, but the condition is not usually painful.

== Causes ==
- Mechanical
  - Increased venous pressure (e.g. extreme g-force, straining, vomiting, choking, sneezing, coughing or strangling) or from straining due to constipation
  - External pressure changes:
    - Atmospheric pressure changes due to aircraft altitude changes
    - Mask squeeze from scuba diving without equalizing mask pressure during descent
  - Eye injury or eye surgery
  - Zygoma fracture (results in lateral subconjunctival bleeding)
- Medical conditions that affect blood or blood vessels:
  - Severe hypertension
  - Viral hemorrhagic fever
  - Coagulation disorder (congenital or acquired)
  - Acute hemorrhagic conjunctivitis (caused by including enterovirus 70, coxsackievirus A24 variant, and adenovirus 11)
  - Leptospirosis

Subconjunctival bleeding in infants may be associated with scurvy (a vitamin C deficiency), abuse or traumatic asphyxia syndrome.

== Diagnosis ==
Diagnosis is by visual inspection, by noting the typical finding of bright red discoloration confined to the white portion (sclera) of the eye. In rare cases blood may drip from the eye.

== Management ==
A subconjunctival bleeding is typically a self-limiting condition that requires no treatment unless there is evidence of an eye infection or there has been significant eye trauma. Artificial tears may be applied four to six times a day if the eye feels dry or scratchy. The elective use of aspirin is typically discouraged.
