= Hand injury =

- Specialty: Emergency medicine, hand surgery, plastic surgery, orthopedic surgery

The hand is a very complex organ with multiple joints, different types of ligament, tendons and nerves. Hand disease injuries are common in society and can result from excessive use, degenerative disorders or trauma.

Trauma to the finger or the hand is quite common in society. In some particular cases, the entire finger may be subject to amputation. The majority of traumatic injuries are work-related. Today, skilled hand surgeons can sometimes reattach the finger or thumb using microsurgery. Sometimes, traumatic injuries may result in loss of skin, and plastic surgeons may place skin and muscle grafts.

== Types ==
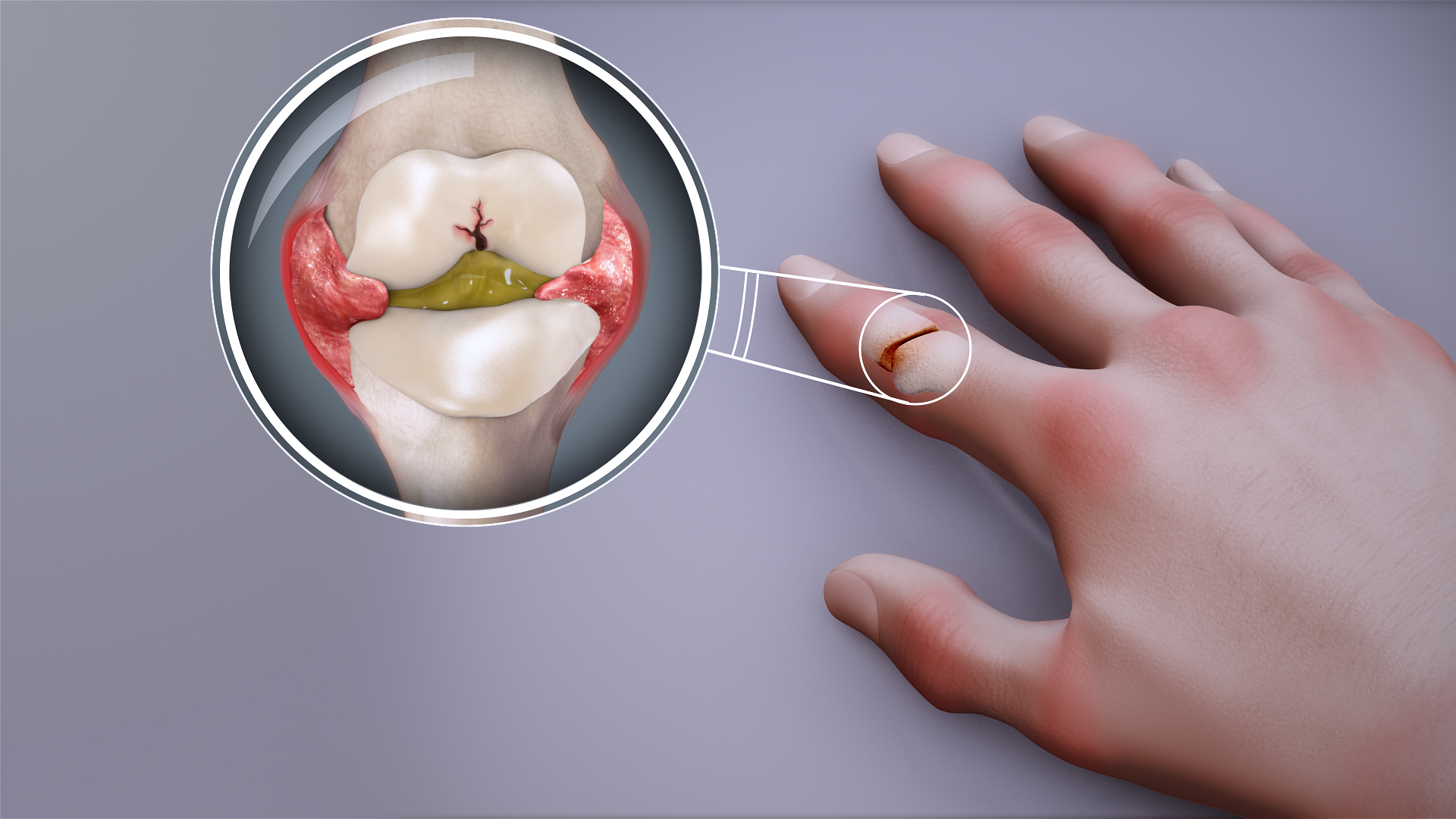
3D medical animation still showing Arthritis infected hand.

Arthritis of the hand is common in females. Osteoarthritis of the hand joints is much less common than rheumatoid arthritis. As the arthritis progresses, the finger gets deformed and loses its functions. Moreover, many patients with rheumatoid arthritis have this dysfunction present in both hands and become disabled due to chronic pain. Osteoarthritis is most common at the base of thumb and is usually treated with pain pills, splinting or steroid injections.

Carpal tunnel syndrome is a common disorder of the hand. This disorder results from compression of the median nerve in the wrist. Disorders like diabetes mellitus, thyroid or rheumatoid arthritis can narrow the tunnel and cause impingement of the nerve. Carpal tunnel syndrome also occurs in people who overuse their hand or perform repetitive actions like using a computer key board, a cashiers machine or a musical instrument. When the nerve is compressed, it can result in disabling symptoms like numbness, tingling, or pain in the middle three fingers. As the condition progresses, it can lead to muscle weakness and inability to hold objects. The pain frequently occurs at night and can even radiate to the shoulder. Even though the diagnosis is straightforward, the treatment is surgical decompression of the median nerve after deroofing of the carpal tunnel.

Dupuytren's contracture is another disorder of the fingers that is due to thickening of the underlying skin tissues of the palm. The disorder results in a deformed finger which appears thin and has small bumps on the surface. Dupuytren's contracture does run in families, but is also associated with diabetes, smoking, seizure recurrence and other vascular disorders. Dupuytren's does not need any treatment as the condition can resolve on its own. However, if finger function is compromised, then surgery may be required.

Ganglion cysts are soft globular structures that occur on the back of the hand usually near the junction of the wrist joint. These small swellings are usually painless when small but can affect hand motion when they become large. The cysts contain a jelly like substance and usually do disappear on their own. If the ganglion cyst is not bothersome, it should be left alone. Just removing the fluid from the cyst is not curative because fluid will come back in less than a week. Surgery is often done for large cysts but the results are poor. Recurrences are common, and there is always the possibility of nerve or joint damage.

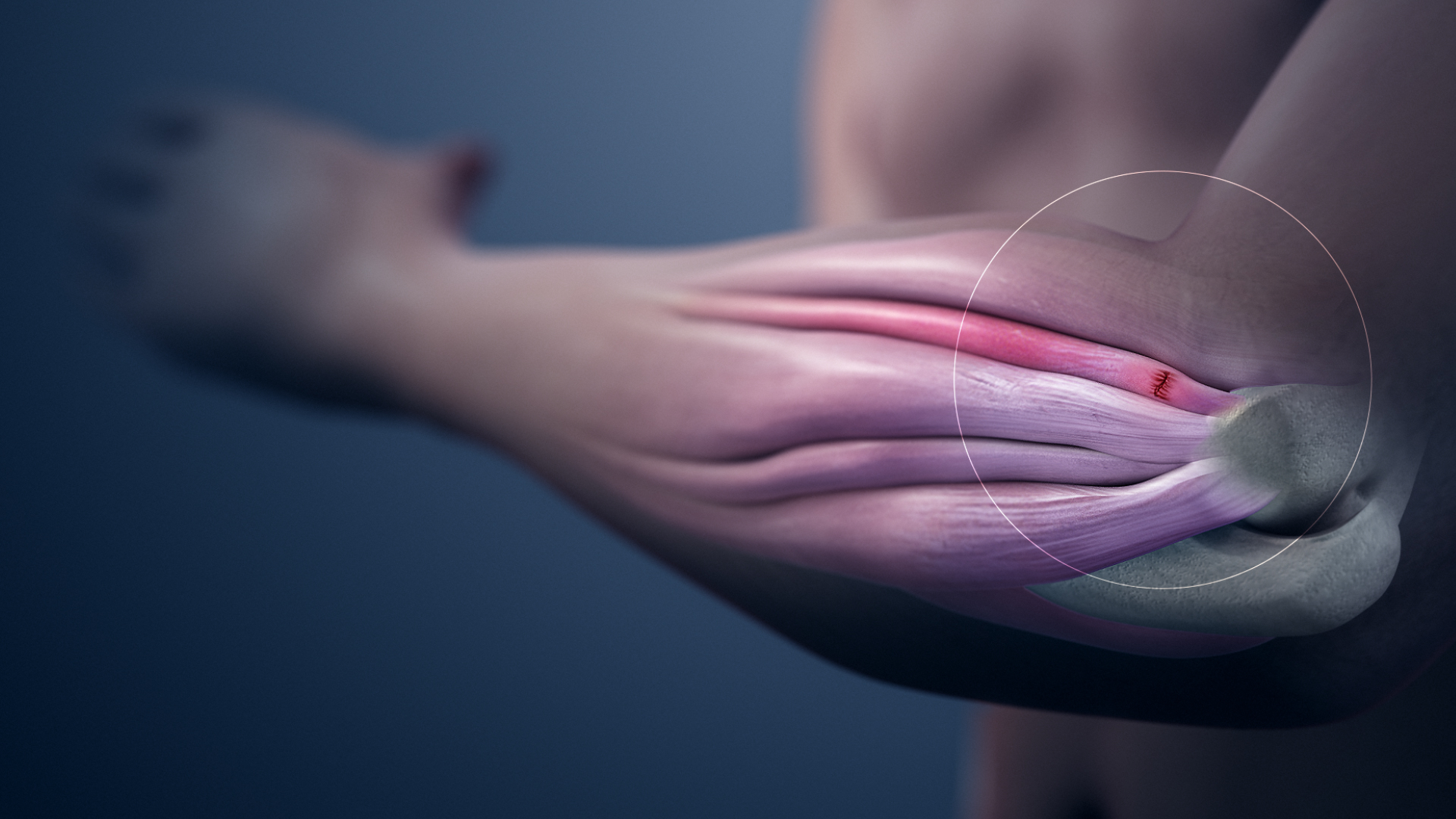
Inflamed tendons of the hand.

Tendinitis is disorder when tendons of the hands become inflamed. Tendons are thick fibrous cords that attach small muscles of the hand to bones. A Tendon is useful for generation of power to bend or extend the finger. When repetitive action is performed, tendons often get inflamed and present with pain and difficulty for moving the finger. In most cases, tendinitis can be treated with rest, ice and wearing splints. In some cases, an injection of corticosteroid may help. Tendinitis is primarily a disorder from overuse but if not treated properly, can become chronic. Severe cases need surgical decompression.

Trigger finger is a common disorder which occurs when the sheath through which tendons pass, become swollen or irritated. Initially, the finger may catch during movement but symptoms like pain, swelling and a snap may occur with time. The finger often gets locked in one position and it may be difficult to straighten or bend the finger. Trigger finger has been found to be associated with diabetes, gout and rheumatoid arthritis.

== Causes ==
Fractures of the fingers occur when the finger or hands hit a solid object. Fractures are most common at the base of the little finger (boxer's fracture). Nerve injuries occur as a result of trauma, compression or over-stretching. Nerves send impulses to the brain about sensation and also play an important role in finger movement. When nerves are injured, one can lose ability to move fingers, lose sensation and develop a contracture. Any nerve injury of the hand can be disabling and results in loss of hand function. Thus it is vital to seek medical help as soon as possible after any hand injury.

Sprains result from forcing a joint to perform against its normal range of motion. Finger sprains occur when the ligaments which are attached to the bone are overstretched and this results in pain, swelling, and difficulty for moving the finger. Common examples of a sprain are jammed or twisted fingers. These injuries are common among ball players but can also occur in laborers and handy men. When finger sprains are not treated on time, prolonged disability can result.

== Diagnosis ==
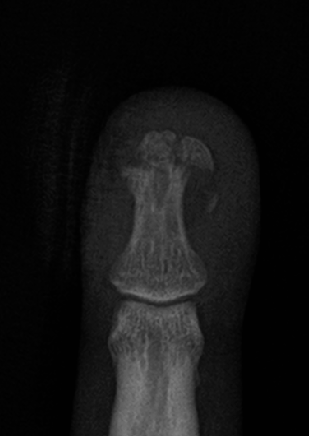
Fracture of the tuft of the finger

Finger injuries are usually diagnosed with x-ray and can get to be considerably painful. The majority of finger injuries can be dealt with conservative care and splints. However, if the bone presents an abnormal angularity or if it is displaced, one may need surgery and pins to hold the bones in place.

== Treatment ==
Most hand injuries are minor and can heal without difficulty. However, any time the hand or finger is cut, crushed or the pain is ongoing, it is best to see a physician. Hand injuries when not treated on time can result in long term morbidity.

Simple hand injuries which need surgery do not typically require antibiotics as they do not change the chance of infection.

Many hand injuries need surgery, but the time from injury to surgery (delays of up to 4 days) doesn't increase the chance of infection

== Epidemiology ==
About 1.8 million people go to the emergency department each year due to hand injuries.
