= Diffuse lamellar keratitis =

- Specialty: Ophthalmology

Diffuse lamellar keratitis (DLK) is a sterile inflammation of the cornea which may occur after refractive surgery, such as LASIK. Its incidence has been estimated to be 1 in 500 patients, though this may be as high as 32% in some cases.

== Signs and symptoms ==
Patients typically present within one week of surgery with eye pain, photophobia, conjunctivitis, or excessive tear production.

== Risk factors ==
DLK is predominantly associated with Lasik, as the creation of a flap creates a potential space for cells to accumulate. Individuals with atopic conditions with pre-existing allergic conjunctivitis, or ocular rosacea, are more prone to developing the condition after surgery. Some authors have reported that moderate to severe eye allergies and chronic allergic conjunctivitis are an absolute contraindication to the LASIK procedure. This is in distinction to findings of earlier studies. Keratitis can also occur after photorefractive keratectomy (PRK), although because it occurs in the setting of infection, it is distinct from the sterile infiltrates of DLK. DLK can also occur following myopic keratomileusis, in which a disc of corneal tissue is removed, shaped and sutured back into place, although this technique is more historical, having been replaced by Lasik and PRK.

== Pathology ==
DLK is usually seen after refractive surgery. Neutrophils infiltrate the corneal stroma in a diffuse, multifocal pattern. Infiltration is confined to the surgical flap interface with no posterior or anterior extension, and overlying epithelium most often remains intact. As it is a sterile process, cultures based on swab tests are negative.

== Diagnosis ==
=== Stages ===
There are 4 stages of disease, with stage 4 being the rarest and most severe.

- Stage 1 Cells infiltrate the periphery of the flap, without involving central cornea.
- Stage 2 Peripheral cells migrate to the center of the cornea, and impair vision; presentation is usually 2 to 3 days after surgery.
- Stage 3 Cells at the central cornea form clumps of dense cell aggregates.
- Stage 4 Otherwise known as central toxic keratopathy, stage 4 characteristically has no inflammatory cells at the anterior chamber or cornea, but there is central stromal necrosis, and the cornea becomes opacified; onset is usually 3 to 9 days after refractive surgery.

== Treatment ==
Depending on severity, therapies may range from topical or oral anti-inflammatories to irrigation and surgical repair.
