= Zygoma fracture =

Form of facial fracture

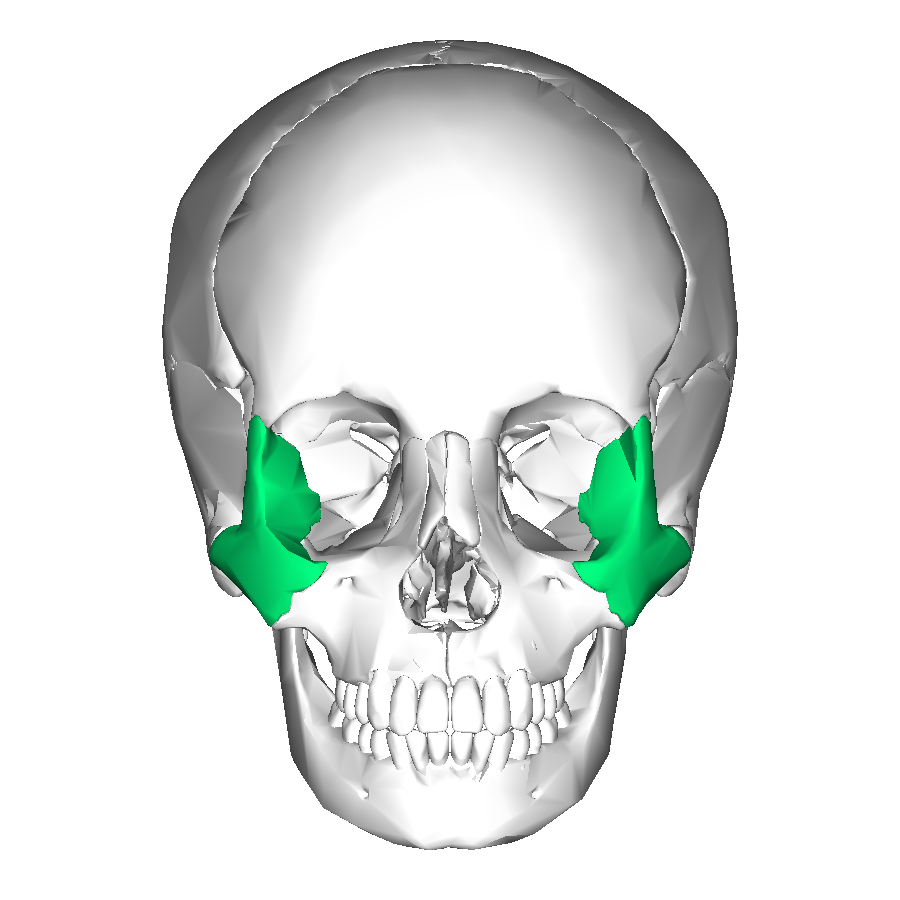
- Zygomatic bone (shown in green).
- Specialty: Orthopedics

A zygoma fracture (zygomatic fracture) is a form of facial fracture caused by a fracture of the zygomatic bone. Symptoms include flattening of the face, trismus (reduced opening of the jaw) and lateral subconjunctival hemorrhage.

== Signs and symptoms ==
When zygoma fractures occur, the most typical symptoms are paresthesias in the upper lip, nose, cheek, and lower eyelid, diplopia, and pain. Particular physical characteristics that support zygomatic fracture include globe injury, impaired ocular motility, globe malposition, orbital emphysema, trismus, palpable stepoffs at the inferior or upper lateral edge of the orbit, reduced feeling throughout the infraorbital nerve's distribution, subconjunctival hemorrhage, periorbital ecchymoses, flattened malar eminence, and widened facial appearance.

== Causes ==
High-impact trauma is almost always the cause of zygoma fractures. Assaults, car crashes, falls, and sports injuries are the most frequent mechanisms.

== See also ==
- Zygomaticomaxillary complex fracture
