= Retrobulbar bleeding =

Sight-threatening emergency

- Other names: Retrobulbar hemorrhage
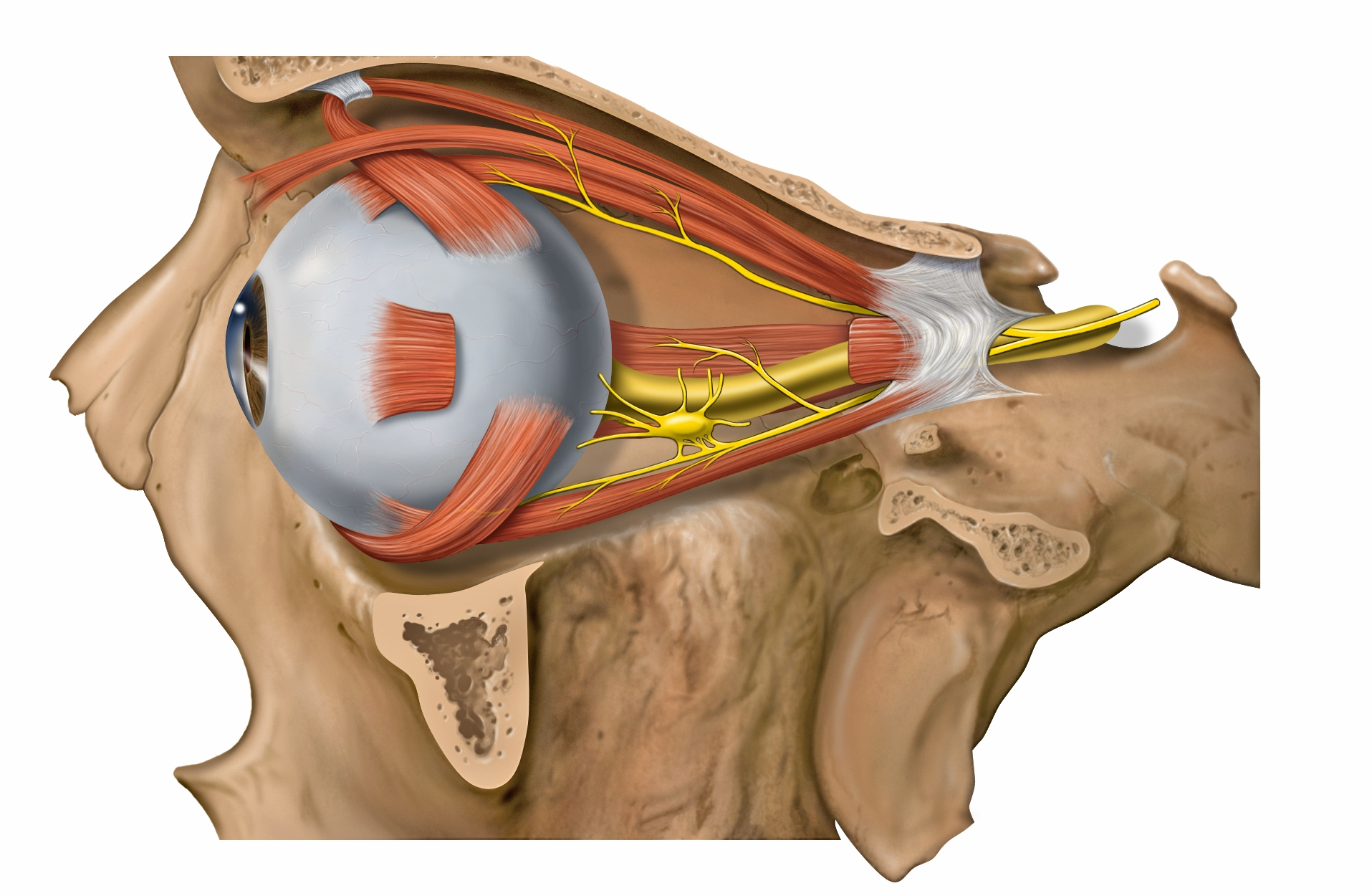
- Anatomy of the orbit, the retrobulbar space is the enclosed space bounded by the eybeball (globe) anteriorly and bones on all other sides
- Specialty: Ophthalmology, emergency medicine
- Complications: Vision loss or reduced vision
- Usual onset: Usually within hours of inciting event
- Causes: Trauma, surgery
- Diagnostic method: Clinical diagnosis based on history of symptoms and examination, computed tomography may also be used to visualize bleeding in the retrobulbar space
- Treatment: Evacuation of blood from retrobulbar space surgically
- Frequency: Rare

Retrobulbar bleeding, also known as retrobulbar hemorrhage, is when bleeding occurs behind the eye. Signs and symptoms may include eye pain, bruising around the eye, the eye bulging outwards, vomiting, and vision loss. Bleeding in the enclosed retrobulbar space causes pressure to build up behind the eye. This increased eye pressure leads to damage of the optic nerve, retina and disruption of blood flow in the retinal artery leading to blindness.

Retrobulbar bleeding is most commonly caused by trauma to the face or eye (such as orbital fractures) and as a complication of surgery to the eye. It may also complicate preibulbar or retrobulbar injections (injections around or behind the eye, respectively). Less commonly, retrobulbar bleeding may be a complication of craniofacial surgery, sinus surgery or neurosurgery. The risk of bleeding is further increased by use of blood thinners or presence of arteriovenous malformations (malformed blood vessels around the eye).

Retrobulbar bleeding is known as orbital compartment syndrome if the bleeding increases the pressure behind the eye. This is routinely diagnosed clinically; based on history, signs, symptoms and an eye exam. Signs that suggest retrobulbar bleeding or orbital compartment syndrome include decreased vision (such as decreased visual acuity, loss of visual fields, double vision, loss of color vision), eye pain, bulging of the eyes, reduced sensation of eyelids, pupils that are less responsive to light, and paralysis of eye movements (ophthalmoplegia). If the diagnosis is unclear, a CT scan can be used to detect blood in the space behind the eye, forward displacement of the affected eye, or stretching of the optic nerve. Experts recommend against delaying treatment to obtain imaging if the diagnosis is clinically probable. Magnetic resonance angiography or venography may be obtained to visualize blood vessels around the eye and localize a source of bleeding, including if vascular malformations are suspected.

In those with suspected retrobulbar bleeding, lateral canthotomy with cantholysis is indicated. This involves cutting tissue between the globe (eyeball) and the lateral corner of the lower eyelid, to allow blood to escape from the enclosed retrobulbar space behind the eye, thus leading to a reduction in pressure behind the eye (retrobulbar pressure). This is recommended to be carried out within two hours. Surgical treatment completed within the first 2 hours are associated with better visual outcomes. If a lateral canthotomy does not relief retrobulbar pressure, orbital bone decompression can be done. This is when parts of the bones lining the orbit are removed to allow blood to escape, reducing critical pressure behind the eye. Definitive treatment may involve localizing and cauterizing the blood vessel responsible for the bleeding.

The condition is rare. A 2018 systematic review found that 74% of retrobulbar bleeds occur after trauma and 26% occur after eye surgery. The review found that symptoms in retrobulbar bleeds typically start after 24 hours of an inciting event. Older age, eye trauma, delays in treatment, and having more severe symptoms were associated with worse outcomes with regards to vision loss. Surgical decompression (manually evacuating blood from behind the eye) was associated with better preservation of vision as compared to non-surgical treatment. Regarding treatment for retrobulbar bleeds; the 2018 review found that 51% of people had a complete recovery of vision, 27% of people had partial recovery of vision, and 22% were blind. Medications such as corticosteroids, carbonic anhydrase inhibitors, osmotic agents (such as mannitol), or other acqueous suppressants are sometimes used to reduce fluid and thus intra-orbital pressure behind the eye. Their benefit is unclear. Other reviews showed that steroids are not helpful.

Retrobulbar bleeding is estimated to complicate 0.45-0.6% of orbital fractures.
