= Estramustine phosphate =

Chemical compound

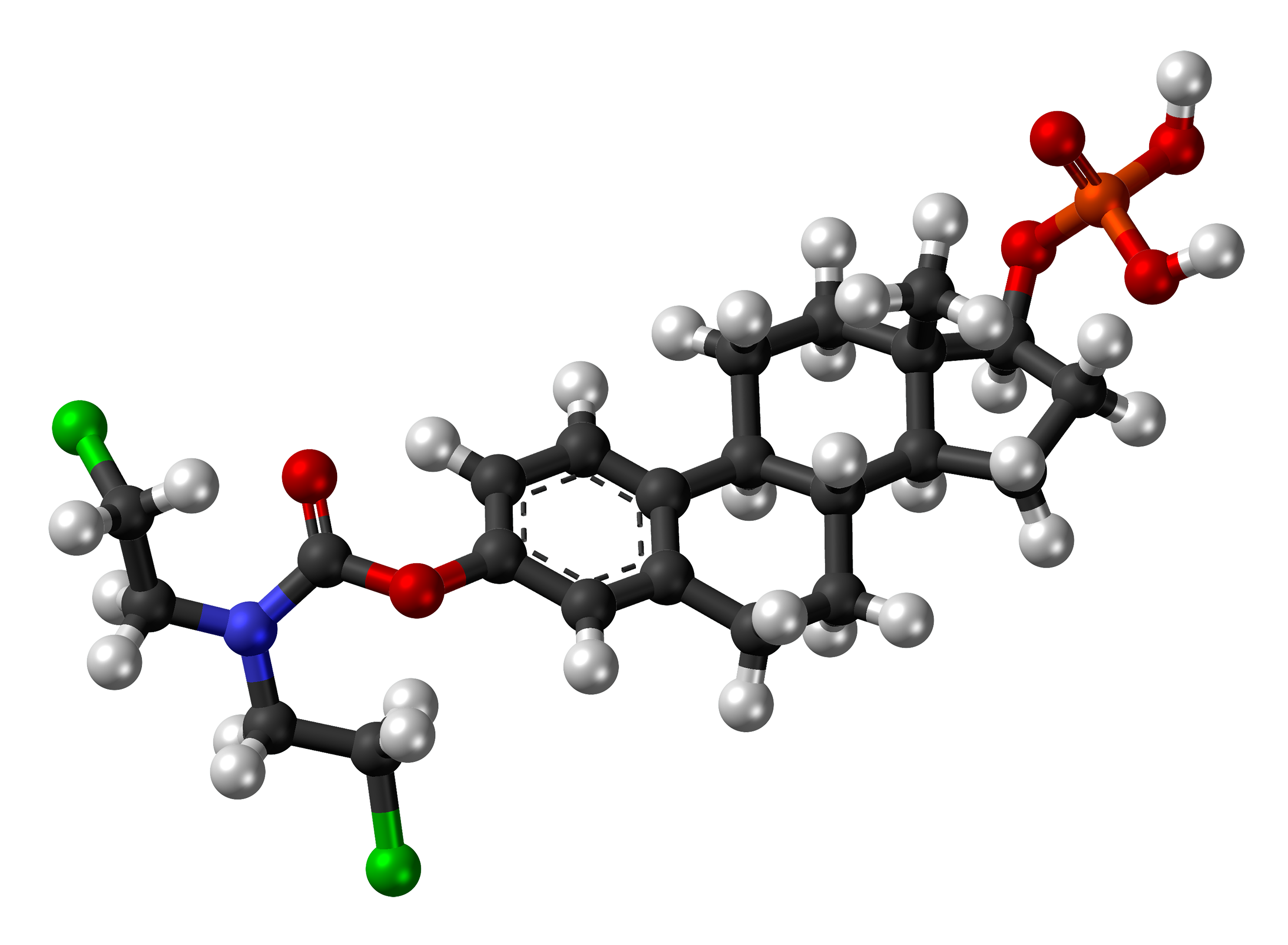

Clinical data
- Trade names: Emcyt, Estracyt
- Other names: EMP; Leo 299; NSC-89199; Ro 21-8837/001; Estradiol normustine phosphate; Estradiol 3-normustine 17β-phosphate; Estradiol 3-(bis(2-chloroethyl)carbamate) 17β-(dihydrogen phosphate)
- AHFS/Drugs.com: Monograph
- MedlinePlus: a608046
- License data: US FDA: Estramustine
- Pregnancy category: AU: D
- Routes of administration: By mouth, IV
- Drug class: Chemotherapeutic agent; Estrogen; Estrogen ester
- ATC code: L01XX11 (WHO)

Legal status
- Legal status: AU: S4 (Prescription only); CA: ℞-only; UK: POM (Prescription only); US: ℞-only

Pharmacokinetic data
- Bioavailability: 44–75% (as estramustine and estromustine)
- Protein binding: • Estradiol: 98% • Estrone: 96%
- Metabolism: Liver, intestines
- Metabolites: • Estramustine • Estromustine • Estradiol • Estrone • Phosphoric acid • Normustine
- Elimination half-life: • EMP: 1.27 hours • Estromustine: 10–14 hrs • Estrone: 15–17 hours
- Excretion: Bile, feces (2.9–4.8%)

Identifiers
- IUPAC name: [(8R,9S,13S,14S,17S)-13-methyl-17-phosphonooxy-6,7,8,9,11,12,14,15,16,17-decahydrocyclopenta[a]phenanthren-3-yl] N,N-bis(2-chloroethyl)carbamate
- CAS Number: 4891-15-0 52205-73-9 (sodium) 325726-21-4 (meglumine)
- PubChem CID: 259329
- IUPHAR/BPS: 9076
- DrugBank: DB01196
- ChemSpider: 227633
- UNII: MUZ9585Y7B
- KEGG: D02398+D06397
- ChEBI: CHEBI:68643
- ChEMBL: ChEMBL1756
- CompTox Dashboard (EPA): DTXSID7048667
- ECHA InfoCard: 100.023.193

Chemical and physical data
- Formula: C_{23}H_{32}Cl_{2}NO_{6}P
- Molar mass: 520.38 g·mol^{−1}
- 3D model (JSmol): Interactive image
- SMILES: C[C@]12CC[C@H]3[C@H]([C@@H]1CC[C@@H]2OP(=O)(O)O)CCC4=C3C=CC(=C4)OC(=O)N(CCCl)CCCl
- InChI: InChI=1S/C23H32Cl2NO6P/c1-23-9-8-18-17-5-3-16(31-22(27)26(12-10-24)13-11-25)14-15(17)2-4-19(18)20(23)6-7-21(23)32-33(28,29)30/h3,5,14,18-21H,2,4,6-13H2,1H3,(H2,28,29,30)/t18-,19-,20+,21+,23+/m1/s1; Key:ADFOJJHRTBFFOF-RBRWEJTLSA-N

Estramustine phosphate (EMP), also known as estradiol normustine phosphate and sold under the brand names Emcyt and Estracyt, is a dual estrogen and chemotherapy medication which is used in the treatment of prostate cancer in men. It is taken multiple times a day by mouth or by injection into a vein.

Side effects of EMP include nausea, vomiting, gynecomastia, feminization, demasculinization, sexual dysfunction, blood clots, and cardiovascular complications. EMP is a dual cytostatic and hence chemotherapeutic agent and a hormonal anticancer agent of the estrogen type. It is a prodrug of estramustine and estromustine in terms of its cytostatic effects and a prodrug of estradiol in relation to its estrogenic effects. EMP has strong estrogenic effects at typical clinical dosages, and consequently has marked antigonadotropic and functional antiandrogenic effects.

EMP was introduced for medical use in the early 1970s. It is available in the United States, Canada, the United Kingdom, other European countries, and elsewhere in the world.

== Medical uses ==
EMP is indicated, in the United States, for the palliative treatment of metastatic and/or progressive prostate cancer, whereas in the United Kingdom it is indicated for the treatment of unresponsive or relapsing prostate cancer. The medication is usually reserved for use in hormone-refractory cases of prostate cancer, although it has been used as a first-line monotherapy as well. Response rates with EMP in prostate cancer are said to be equivalent to conventional high-dose estrogen therapy.

Due to its relatively severe side effects and toxicity, EMP has rarely been used in the treatment of prostate cancer. This is especially true in Western countries today. As a result, and also due to the scarce side effects of gonadotropin-releasing hormone modulators (GnRH modulators) like leuprorelin, EMP was almost abandoned. However, encouraging clinical research findings resulted in renewed interest of EMP for the treatment of prostate cancer.

EMP has been used at doses of 140 to 1,400 mg/day orally in the treatment of prostate cancer. However, oral EMP is most commonly used at a dose of 560 to 640 mg/day (280–320 mg twice daily). The recommended dosage of oral EMP in the Food and Drug Administration (FDA) label for Emcyt is 14 mg per kg of body weight (i.e., one 140 mg oral capsule for each 10 kg or 22 lbs of body weight) given in 3 or 4 divided doses per day. The label states that most patients in studies of oral EMP in the United States have received 10 to 16 mg per kg per day. This would be about 900 to 1,440 mg/day for a 90-kg or 200-lb man. Lower doses of oral EMP, such as 280 mg/day, have been found to have comparable effectiveness as higher doses but with improved tolerability and reduced toxicity. Doses of 140 mg/day have been described as a very low dosage. EMP has been used at doses of 240 to 450 mg/day intravenously.

EMP and other estrogens such as polyestradiol phosphate and ethinylestradiol are far less costly than newer therapies such as GnRH modulators, abiraterone acetate, and enzalutamide. In addition, estrogens may offer significant benefits over other means of androgen deprivation therapy, for instance in terms of bone loss and fractures, hot flashes, cognition, and metabolic status.

EMP has been used to prevent the testosterone flare at the start of GnRH agonist therapy in men with prostate cancer.

Estrogen dosages for prostate cancer
Route/form	Estrogen	Dosage
Oral	Estradiol	1–2 mg 3x/day
Oral	Conjugated estrogens	1.25–2.5 mg 3x/day
Oral	Ethinylestradiol	0.15–3 mg/day
Oral	Ethinylestradiol sulfonate	1–2 mg 1x/week
Oral	Diethylstilbestrol	1–3 mg/day
Oral	Dienestrol	5 mg/day
Oral	Hexestrol	5 mg/day
Oral	Fosfestrol	100–480 mg 1–3x/day
Oral	Chlorotrianisene	12–48 mg/day
Oral	Quadrosilan	900 mg/day
Oral	Estramustine phosphate	140–1400 mg/day
Transdermal patch	Estradiol	2–6x 100 μg/day Scrotal: 1x 100 μg/day
IM or SC injection	Estradiol benzoate	1.66 mg 3x/week
IM or SC injection	Estradiol dipropionate	5 mg 1x/week
IM or SC injection	Estradiol valerate	10–40 mg 1x/1–2 weeks
IM or SC injection	Estradiol undecylate	100 mg 1x/4 weeks
IM or SC injection	Polyestradiol phosphate	Alone: 160–320 mg 1x/4 weeks With oral EE: 40–80 mg 1x/4 weeks
IM or SC injection	Estrone	2–4 mg 2–3x/week
IV injection	Fosfestrol	300–1200 mg 1–7x/week
IV injection	Estramustine phosphate	240–450 mg/day
Note: Dosages are not necessarily equivalent. Sources: See template.

=== Available forms ===
EMP is or has been available in the form of both capsules (140 mg, 280 mg) for oral administration and aqueous solutions (300 mg) for intravenous injection.

== Contraindications ==
EMP is contraindicated when used in children, patients hypersensitive to estrogens or nitrogen mustards, those with peptic ulcer (an ulcer in the digestive tract), those with severely compromised liver function, those with weak heart muscle (also known as myocardial insufficiency) and those with thromboembolic disorders or complications related to fluid retention.

== Side effects ==
The side effects of EMP overall have been described as relatively severe. The most common side effects of EMP have been reported to be gastrointestinal side effects like nausea, vomiting, and diarrhea, with nausea and vomiting occurring in 40% of men. They are usually mild or moderate in severity, and the nausea and vomiting can be managed with prophylactic antiemetic medications. Nonetheless, severe cases of gastrointestinal side effects with EMP may require dose reduction or discontinuation of therapy. Although nausea and vomiting have been reported to be the most common side effects of EMP, gynecomastia (male breast development) has been found to occur in as many as 83% of men treated with EMP, and the incidence of erectile dysfunction is possibly similar to or slightly less than the risk of gynecomastia. As a rule, feminization, a gynoid fat distribution, demasculinization, and impotence are said to occur in virtually or nearly 100% of men treated with high-dose estrogen therapy. Decreased sexual activity has also been reported in men treated with EMP. These side effects are due to high estrogen levels and low testosterone levels. Prophylactic irradiation of the breasts can be used to decrease the incidence and severity of gynecomastia with estrogens.

Severe adverse effects of EMP are thromboembolic and cardiovascular complications including pulmonary embolism, deep vein thrombosis, stroke, thrombophlebitis, coronary artery disease (ischemic heart disease; e.g., myocardial infarction), thrombophlebitis, and congestive heart failure with fluid retention. EMP produces cardiovascular toxicity similarly to diethylstilbestrol, but to a lesser extent in comparison at low doses (e.g., 280 mg/day oral EMP vs. 1 mg/day oral diethylstilbestrol). The prostate cancer disease state also increases the risk of thromboembolism, and combination with docetaxel may exacerbate the risk of thromboembolism as well. Meta-analyses of clinical trials have found that the overall risk of thromboembolism with EMP is 4 to 7%, relative to 0.4% for chemotherapy regimens without EMP. Thromboembolism is the major toxicity-related cause of discontinuation of EMP. Anticoagulant therapy with medications such as aspirin, warfarin, unfractionated and low-molecular-weight heparin, and vitamin K antagonists can be useful for decreasing the risk of thromboembolism with EMP and other estrogens like diethylstilbestrol and ethinylestradiol.

Adverse liver function tests are commonly seen with EMP, but severe liver dysfunction is rare with the medication. Central nervous system side effects are rarely seen with EMP, although enlarged ventricles and neuronal pigmentation have been reported in monkeys treated with very high doses of EMP (20–140 mg/kg/day) for 3 to 6 months. EMP does not appear to have cytostatic effects in normal brain tissue. In women treated with EMP in clinical studies, a few instances of minor gynecological hemorrhages have been observed. EMP is described as relatively well tolerated among cytostatic antineoplastic and nitrogen-mustard agents, rarely or not at all being associated with significant hematologic toxicity such as myelosuppression (bone marrow suppression), gastrointestinal toxicity, or other more marked toxicity associated with such agents. In contrast to most other cytostatic agents, which often cause myelosuppression, leukopenia (decreased white blood cell count), and neutropenia (decreased neutrophil count), EMP actually produces leukocytosis (increased white blood cell count) as a side effect.

In a small low-dose study using 280 mg/day oral EMP for 150 days, tolerability was significantly improved, with gastrointestinal irritation occurring in only 15% of men, and there was no incidence of severe cardiovascular toxicity or deep vein thrombosis. In addition, no other side effects besides slight transient elevated liver enzymes were observed. These findings suggest that lower doses of oral EMP may be a safer option than higher doses for the treatment of prostate cancer. However, a subsequent 2004 meta-analysis of 23 studies of thromboembolic events with EMP found substantial incidence of thromboembolic events regardless of dosage and no association of EMP dose with risk of these complications.

Side effects of estramustine phosphate (EMC)
System organ class	Very common (≥10%)	Common (1–10%)	Frequency unknown^{c}
Blood and lymphatic system disorders	Anemia; Leukopenia	Thrombocytopenia	
Immune system disorders			Hypersensitivity
Metabolism and nutrition disorders	Fluid retention		
Psychiatric disorders			Confusional state; Depression
Nervous system disorders		Lethargy; Headache	
Cardiac disorders	Congestive heart failure	Myocardial infarction	Myocardial ischemia
Vascular disorders		Embolism	Hypertension
Gastrointestinal disorders	Nausea^{b}; Vomiting^{b}; Diarrhea^{b}		
Hepatobiliary disorders	Abnormal hepatic function		
Skin and subcutaneous tissue disorders			Angioedema^{c}; Allergic dermatitis
Musculoskeletal and connective tissue disorders			Muscle weakness
Reproductive system and breast disorders	Gynecomastia		Erectile dysfunction
General disorders and administration site conditions			Injection site thrombosis (IV solution)
Footnotes: ^{a} = Could not be estimated from available data. ^{b} = Especially during the first 2 weeks of therapy. ^{c} = Angioedema (Quincke edema, larynx edema) can occur. Often occurs in combination with ACE inhibitors. EMP should be immediately discontinued if angioedema occurs. Sources: See template.

Side effects of estramustine phosphate (FDA)
Side effect	Estramustine phosphate (oral 11.5–15.9 mg/kg/day) (n = 93) (%)	Diethylstilbestrol (oral 3.0 mg/day) (n = 93) (%)
Cardiovascular and respiratory
Cardiac arrest	0	2
Cerebrovascular accident (stroke)	2	0
Myocardial infarction (heart attack)	3	1
Thrombophlebitis	3	7
Pulmonary embolism	2	5
Congestive heart failure	3	2
Edema (swelling)	19	17
Dyspnea (shortness of breath)	11	3
Leg cramps	8	11
Upper respiratory discharge	1	1
Hoarseness	1	0
Gastrointestinal
Nausea	15	8
Diarrhea	12	11
Minor gastrointestinal upset	11	6
Anorexia (appetite loss)	4	3
Flatulence	2	0
Vomiting	1	1
Gastrointestinal bleeding	1	0
Burning throat	1	0
Thirst	1	0
Integumentary
Rash	1	4
Pruritus (itching)	2	2
Dry skin	2	0
Pigment changes	0	3
Easy bruising	3	0
Flushing	1	0
Night sweats	0	1
Peeling of fingertip skin	1	0
Thinning hair	1	1
Breast changes
Breast tenderness	66	64
Breast enlargement (gynecomastia or male breast development)
Mild	60	54
Moderate	10	16
Marked	0	5
Miscellaneous
Lethargy alone	4	3
Depression	0	2
Emotional lability	2	0
Insomnia	3	0
Headache	1	1
Anxiety	1	0
Chest pain	1	1
Hot flashes	0	1
Eye pain	0	1
Lacrimation (eye tears)	1	1
Tinnitus	0	1
Laboratory abnormalities
Hematologic (blood)
Leukopenia (low white blood cells)	4	2
Thrombopenia (low platelets)	1	2
Hepatic (liver)
Bilirubin alone	1	5
Bilirubin and LDH	0	1
Bilirubin and AST	2	1
Bilirubin, LDH, and SGOT	2	0
LDH and/or SGOT	31	28
Miscellaneous
Transient hypercalcemia (high calcium)	0	1

== Overdose ==
There has been no clinical experience with overdose of EMP. Overdose of EMP may result in pronounced manifestations of the known adverse effects of the medication. There is no specific antidote for overdose of EMP. In the event of overdose, gastric lavage should be used to evacuate gastric contents as necessary and treatment should be symptom-based and supportive. In the case of dangerously low counts of red blood cells, white blood cells, or platelets, whole blood may be given as needed. Liver function should be monitored with EMP overdose. After an overdose of EMP, hematological and hepatic parameters should continue to be monitored for at least 6 weeks.

EMP has been used at high doses of as much as 1,260 mg/day by the oral route and 240 to 450 mg/day by intravenous injection.

== Interactions ==
EMP has been reported to increase the efficacy and toxicity of tricyclic antidepressants like amitriptyline and imipramine. When products containing calcium, aluminium, and/or magnesium, such as dairy products like milk, various foods dietary supplements, and antacids, are consumed concomitantly with EMP, an insoluble chelate complex/phosphate salt between EMP and these metals can be formed, and this can markedly impair the absorption and hence oral bioavailability of EMP. There may be an increased risk of angioedema in those concurrently taking ACE inhibitors.

== Pharmacology ==
=== Pharmacodynamics ===
Estramustine, the major active cytostatic form of estramustine phosphate.

Estradiol, the major active estrogenic form of estramustine phosphate.

EMP, also known as estradiol normustine phosphate, is a combined estrogen ester and nitrogen mustard ester. It consists of estradiol, an estrogen, linked with a phosphate ester as well as an ester of normustine, a nitrogen mustard. In terms of its pharmacodynamic effects, EMP is a prodrug of estramustine, estromustine, and estradiol. As a prodrug of estradiol, EMP is an estrogen and hence an agonist of the estrogen receptors. EMP itself has only very weak affinity for the estrogen receptors. The medication is of about 91% higher molecular weight than estradiol due to the presence of its C3 normustine and C17β phosphate esters. Because EMP is a prodrug of estradiol, it may be considered to be a natural and bioidentical form of estrogen, although it does have additional cytostatic activity via estramustine and estromustine.

EMP acts by a dual mechanism of action: 1) direct cytostatic activity via a number of actions; and 2) as a form of high-dose estrogen therapy via estrogen receptor-mediated antigonadotropic and functional antiandrogenic effects. The antigonadotropic and functional antiandrogenic effects of EMP consist of strong suppression of gonadal androgen production and hence circulating levels of androgens such as testosterone; greatly increased levels of sex hormone-binding globulin and hence a decreased fraction of free androgens in the circulation; and direct antiandrogenic actions in prostate cells. The free androgen index with oral EMP has been found to be on average 4.6-fold lower than with orchiectomy. As such, EMP therapy results in considerably stronger androgen deprivation than orchiectomy. Metabolites of EMP, including estramustine, estromustine, estradiol, and estrone, have been found to act as weak antagonists of the androgen receptor (EC_{50} = 0.5–3.1 μM), although the clinical significance of this is unknown.

Extremely high levels of estradiol and estrone occur during EMP therapy. The estrogenic metabolites of EMP are responsible for its most common adverse effects and its cardiovascular toxicity. EMP has been described as having relatively weak estrogenic effects in some publications. However, it has shown essentially the same rates and degrees of estrogenic effects, such as breast tenderness, gynecomastia, cardiovascular toxicity, changes in liver protein synthesis, and testosterone suppression, as high-dose diethylstilbestrol and ethinylestradiol in clinical studies. The notion that EMP has relatively weak estrogen activity may have been based on animal research, which found that EMP had 100-fold lower uterotrophic effects than estradiol in rats, and may also not have taken into account the very high doses of EMP used clinically in humans.

The mechanism of action of the cytostatic effects of EMP is complex and only partially understood. EMP is considered to mainly be a mitotic inhibitor, inhibiting mechanisms involved in the mitosis phase of the cell cycle. Specifically, it binds to microtubule-associated proteins and/or to tubulin and produces depolymerization of microtubules (K_{d} = 10–20 μM for estramustine), resulting in the arrest of cell division in the G_{2}/M phase (specifically metaphase). EMP was originally thought to mediate its cytostatic effects as a prodrug of normustine, a nitrogen mustard, and hence was thought to be an alkylating antineoplastic agent. However, subsequent research has found that EMP is devoid of alkylating actions, and that the influence of EMP on microtubules is mediated by intact estramustine and estromustine, with normustine or estradiol alone having only minor or negligible effects. As such, the unique properties of the estramustine and estromustine structures, containing a carbamate-ester bond, appear to be responsible for the cytostatic effects of EMP. In addition to its antimitotic actions, EMP has also been found to produce other cytostatic effects, including induction of apoptosis, interference with DNA synthesis, nuclear matrix interaction, cell membrane alterations, induction of reactive oxygen species (free oxygen radicals), and possibly additional mechanisms. EMP has been found to have a radiosensitizing effect in prostate cancer and glioma cells, improving sensitivity to radiation therapy as well.

The cytostatic metabolites of EMP are accumulated in tissues in a selective manner, for instance in prostate cancer cells. This may be due to the presence of a specific estramustine-binding protein (EMBP) (K_{d} = 10–35 nM for estramustine), also known as prostatin or prostatic secretion protein (PSP), which has been detected in prostate cancer, glioma, melanoma, and breast cancer cells. Because of its tissue selectivity, EMP is said to produce minimal cytostatic effects in healthy tissues, and its tissue selectivity may be responsible for its therapeutic cytostatic efficacy against prostate cancer cells.

EMP was originally developed as a dual ester prodrug of an estrogen and normustine as a nitrogen mustard alkylating antineoplastic agent which, due to the affinity of the estrogen moiety for estrogen receptors, would be selectively accumulated in estrogen target tissues and hence estrogen receptor-positive tumor cells. Consequentially, it was thought that EMP would preferentially deliver the alkylating normustine moiety to these tissues, allowing for reduced cytostatic effects in healthy tissues and hence improved efficacy and tolerability. However, subsequent research found that there is very limited and slow cleavage of the normustine ester and that EMP is devoid of alkylating activity. In addition, it appears that estramustine and estromustine may be preferentially accumulated in estrogen target tissues not due to affinity for the estrogen receptors, but instead due to affinity for the distinct EMBP.

Extremely high, pregnancy-like levels of estradiol may be responsible for the leukocytosis (increased white blood cell count) that is observed in individuals treated with EMP. This side effect is in contrast to most other cytotoxic agents, which instead cause myelosuppression (bone marrow suppression), leukopenia (decreased white blood cell count), and neutropenia (decreased neutrophil count).

==== Antigonadotropic effects ====
EMP at a dosage 280 mg/day has been found to suppress testosterone levels in men into the castrate range (to 30 ng/dL) within 20 days and to the low castrate range (to 10 ng/dL) within 30 days. Similarly, a dosage of 70 mg/day EMP suppressed testosterone levels into the castrate range within 4 weeks.

=== Pharmacokinetics ===
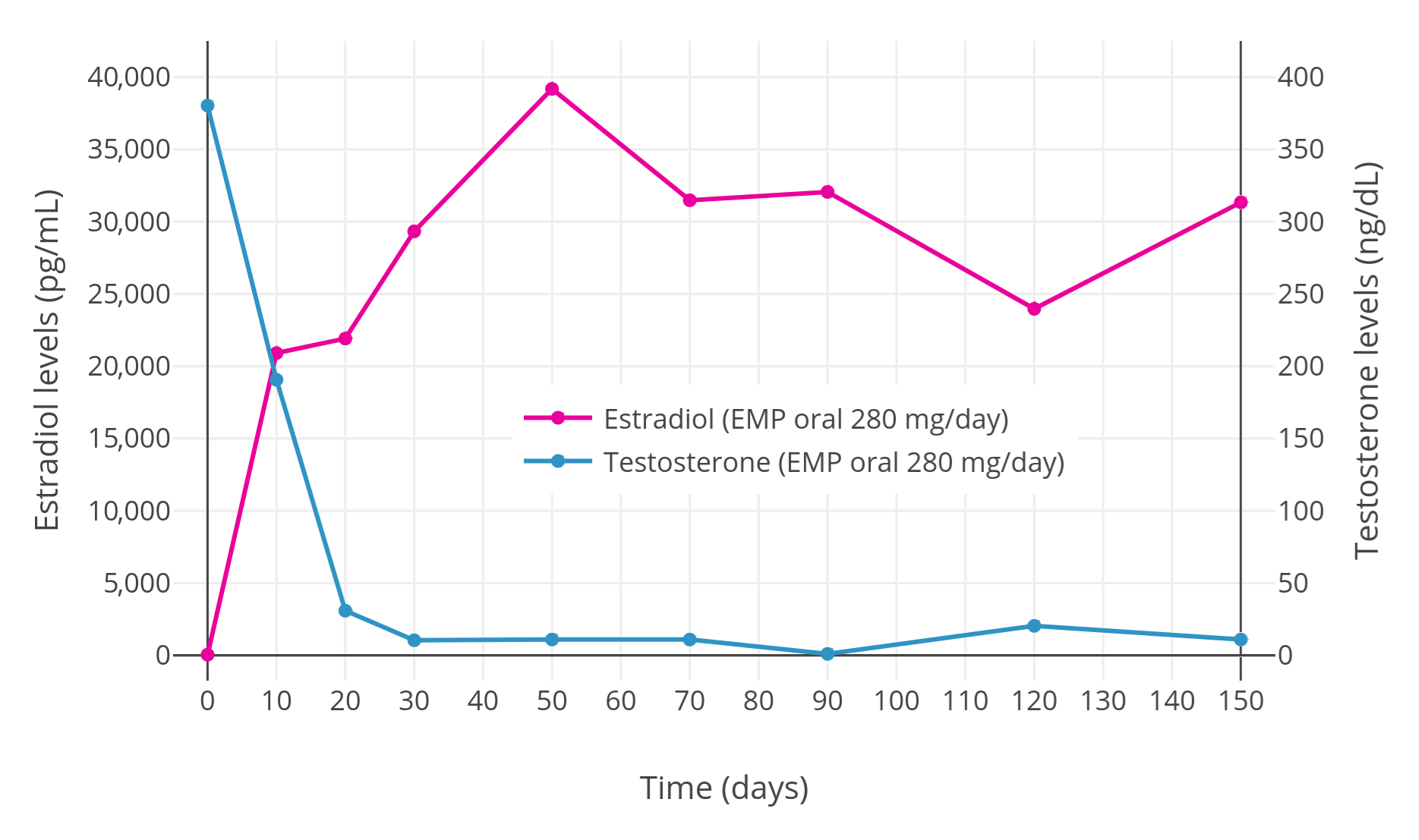
Estradiol and testosterone levels during therapy with 280 mg/day oral EMP in men with prostate cancer (n = 11).

Pharmacokinetics of estromustine after a single dose of EMP in men with prostate cancer (n = 5)
Parameter	IV 300 mg	Oral 420 mg
C_{max}	506 ± 61 ng/mL	362 ± 38 ng/mL
T_{max}	2.6 ± 0.4 hours	2.2 ± 0.2 hours
t_{1/2}	10.3 ± 0.95 hours	13.6 ± 3.09 hours
AUC_{0–32}	4.82 ± 0.62	2.88 ± 0.34
Bioavailability	100.0%	43.7% ± 4.6%

Levels of EMP metabolites during continuous therapy with 560 mg/day oral EMP in men
Metabolite	Plasma	Ratio
Estramustine	20,000–23,000 pg/mL	1:9.6–9.8
Estromustine	191,000–267,000 pg/mL	1:9.6–9.8
Estradiol	4,900–9,000 pg/mL	1:9.4–11.8
Estrone	71,000–85,000 pg/mL	1:9.4–11.8

Upon oral ingestion, EMP is rapidly and completely dephosphorylated by phosphatases into estramustine during the first pass in the gastrointestinal tract. Estramustine is also partially but considerably oxidized into estromustine by 17β-hydroxysteroid dehydrogenases during the first pass. As such, EMP reaches the circulation as estramustine and estromustine, and the major metabolite of EMP is estromustine. A limited quantity of approximately 10 to 15% of estramustine and estromustine is further slowly metabolized via hydrolysis of the normustine ester into estradiol and estrone, respectively. This reaction is believed to be catalyzed by carbamidases, although the genes encoding the responsible enzymes have not been characterized. The circulating levels of normustine formed from EMP are insignificant. Release of nitrogen mustard gas from normustine via cleavage of the carboxylic acid group has not been demonstrated and does not seem to occur.

The oral bioavailability of EMP is low, which is due to profound first-pass metabolism; specifically, dephosphorylation of EMP. The oral bioavailability of EMP specifically as estramustine and estromustine is 44 to 75%, suggesting that absorption may be incomplete. In any case, there is a linear relationship between the oral dose of EMP and circulating levels of estramustine and estromustine. Consumption of calcium, aluminium, or magnesium with oral EMP can markedly impair its bioavailability due to diminished absorption from the intestines, and this may interfere with its therapeutic effectiveness at low doses.

Following a single oral dose of 420 mg EMP in men with prostate cancer, maximal levels of estromustine were 310 to 475 ng/mL (475,000 pg/mL) and occurred after 2 to 3 hours. Estradiol levels with 280 mg/day oral EMP have been found to increase to very high concentrations within one week of therapy. In one study, levels of estradiol were over 20,000 pg/mL after 10 days, were about 30,000 pg/mL after 30 days, and peaked at about 40,000 pg/mL at 50 days. Another study found lower estradiol levels of 4,900 to 9,000 pg/mL during chronic therapy with 560 mg/day oral EMP. An additional study found estradiol levels of about 17,000 pg/mL with 140 mg/day oral EMP and 38,000 pg/mL with 280 mg/day oral EMP. The circulating levels of estradiol and estrone during EMP therapy have been reported to exceed normal levels in men by more than 100- and 1,000-fold, respectively. Levels of estramustine and estradiol in the circulation are markedly lower than those of estromustine and estrone, respectively, with a ratio of about 1:10 in both cases. Nonetheless, estradiol levels during EMP therapy appear to be similar to those that occur in mid-to-late pregnancy, which range from 5,000 to 40,000 pg/mL. No unchanged EMP is seen in the circulation with oral administration.

The pharmacokinetics of EMP are different with intravenous injection. Following a single intravenous injection of 300 mg EMP, levels of EMP were higher than those of its metabolites for the first 8 hours. This is likely due to the bypassing of first-pass metabolism. However, by 24 hours after the dose, unchanged EMP could no longer be detected in the circulation. The clearance of EMP from blood plasma is 4.85 ± 0.684 L/h. The volumes of distribution of EMP with intravenous injection were small; under a two-compartment model, the volume of distribution for the central compartment was 0.043 L/kg and for the peripheral compartment was 0.11 L/kg. The plasma protein binding of EMP is high. Estramustine is accumulated in tumor tissue, for instance prostate cancer and glioma tissue, with estramustine levels much higher in these tissues than in plasma (e.g., 6.3- and 15.9-fold, respectively). Conversely, levels of estromustine in tumor versus plasma are similar (1.0- and 0.5-fold, respectively). Estramustine and estromustine appear to accumulate in adipose tissue.

The elimination half-life of estromustine with oral EMP was 13.6 hours on average, with a range of 8.8 to 22.7 hours. Conversely, the elimination half-life of estromustine with intravenous injection was 10.3 hours, with a range of 7.36 to 12.3 hours. For comparison, the corresponding elimination half-lives of estrone were 16.5 and 14.7 hours for oral and intravenous administration, respectively. Estramustine and estromustine are mainly excreted in bile and hence in feces. They are not believed to be excreted in urine.

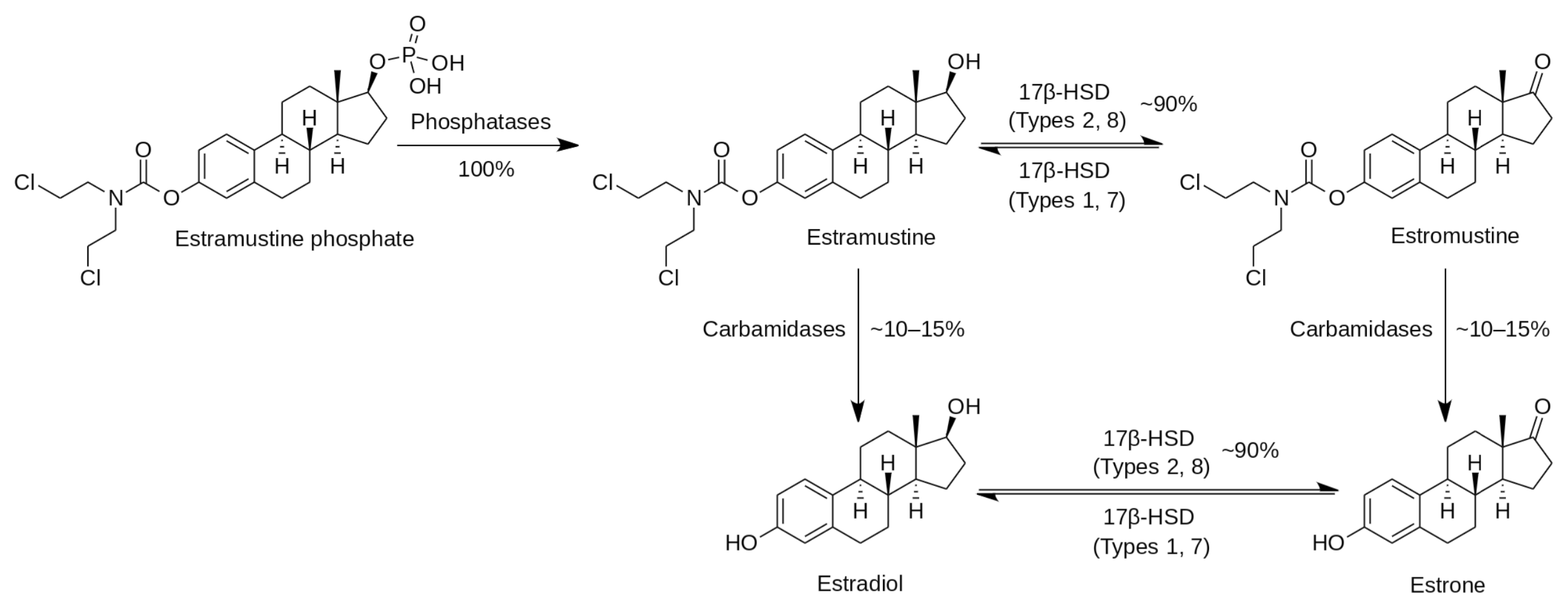
Metabolism of oral estramustine phosphate in humans.

== Chemistry ==
EMP, also known as estradiol 3-normustine 17β-phosphate or as estradiol 3-(bis(2-chloroethyl)carbamate) 17β-(dihydrogen phosphate), is a synthetic estrane steroid and a derivative of estradiol. It is an estrogen ester; specifically, EMP is a diester of estradiol with a C3 normustine (nitrogen mustard–carbamate moiety) ester and a C17β phosphate ester. EMP is provided as the sodium or meglumine salt. EMP is similar as a compound to other estradiol esters such as estradiol sulfate and estradiol valerate, but differs in the presence of its nitrogen mustard ester moiety. Antineoplastic agents related to EMP, although none of them were marketed, include alestramustine, atrimustine, cytestrol acetate, estradiol mustard, ICI-85966, and phenestrol.

Due to its hydrophilic phosphate ester moiety, EMP is a readily water-soluble compound. This is in contrast to most other estradiol esters, which are fatty acid esters and lipophilic compounds that are not particularly soluble in water. Unlike EMP, estramustine is highly lipophilic, practically insoluble in water, and non-ionizable. The phosphate ester of EMP was incorporated into the molecule in order to increase its water solubility and allow for intravenous administration.

The molecular weight of EMP sodium is 564.3 g/mol, of EMP meglumine is 715.6 g/mol, of EMP is 520.4 g/mol, of estramustine is 440.4 g/mol, and of estradiol is 272.4 g/mol. As a result of these differences in molecular weights, EMP contains about 52%, EMP sodium about 48%, and EMP meglumine about 38% of the amount of estradiol within their structures as does an equal-mass quantity of estradiol.

Structural properties of selected estradiol esters
Estrogen	Structure	Ester(s)				Relative mol. weight	Relative E2 content^{b}	log P^{c}
Estrogen	Structure	Position(s)	Moiet(ies)	Type	Length^{a}	Relative mol. weight	Relative E2 content^{b}	log P^{c}
Estradiol		–	–	–	–	1.00	1.00	4.0
Estradiol acetate		C3	Ethanoic acid	Straight-chain fatty acid	2	1.15	0.87	4.2
Estradiol benzoate		C3	Benzoic acid	Aromatic fatty acid	– (~4–5)	1.38	0.72	4.7
Estradiol dipropionate		C3, C17β	Propanoic acid (×2)	Straight-chain fatty acid	3 (×2)	1.41	0.71	4.9
Estradiol valerate		C17β	Pentanoic acid	Straight-chain fatty acid	5	1.31	0.76	5.6–6.3
Estradiol benzoate butyrate		C3, C17β	Benzoic acid, butyric acid	Mixed fatty acid	– (~6, 2)	1.64	0.61	6.3
Estradiol cypionate		C17β	Cyclopentylpropanoic acid	Cyclic fatty acid	– (~6)	1.46	0.69	6.9
Estradiol enanthate		C17β	Heptanoic acid	Straight-chain fatty acid	7	1.41	0.71	6.7–7.3
Estradiol dienanthate		C3, C17β	Heptanoic acid (×2)	Straight-chain fatty acid	7 (×2)	1.82	0.55	8.1–10.4
Estradiol undecylate		C17β	Undecanoic acid	Straight-chain fatty acid	11	1.62	0.62	9.2–9.8
Estradiol stearate		C17β	Octadecanoic acid	Straight-chain fatty acid	18	1.98	0.51	12.2–12.4
Estradiol distearate		C3, C17β	Octadecanoic acid (×2)	Straight-chain fatty acid	18 (×2)	2.96	0.34	20.2
Estradiol sulfate		C3	Sulfuric acid	Water-soluble conjugate	–	1.29	0.77	0.3–3.8
Estradiol glucuronide		C17β	Glucuronic acid	Water-soluble conjugate	–	1.65	0.61	2.1–2.7
Estramustine phosphate^{d}		C3, C17β	Normustine, phosphoric acid	Water-soluble conjugate	–	1.91	0.52	2.9–5.0
Polyestradiol phosphate^{e}		C3–C17β	Phosphoric acid	Water-soluble conjugate	–	1.23^{f}	0.81^{f}	2.9^{g}
Footnotes: ^{a} = Length of ester in carbon atoms for straight-chain fatty acids or approximate length of ester in carbon atoms for aromatic or cyclic fatty acids. ^{b} = Relative estradiol content by weight (i.e., relative estrogenic exposure). ^{c} = Experimental or predicted octanol/water partition coefficient (i.e., lipophilicity/hydrophobicity). Retrieved from PubChem, ChemSpider, and DrugBank. ^{d} = Also known as estradiol normustine phosphate. ^{e} = Polymer of estradiol phosphate (~13 repeat units). ^{f} = Relative molecular weight or estradiol content per repeat unit. ^{g} = log P of repeat unit (i.e., estradiol phosphate). Sources: See individual articles.

== History ==
EMP was first synthesized in the mid-1960s and was patented in 1967. It was initially developed for the treatment of breast cancer. The idea for EMP was inspired by the uptake and accumulation of radiolabeled estrogens into breast cancer tissue. However, initial clinical findings of EMP in women with breast cancer were disappointing. Subsequently, radiolabeled EMP was found to be taken up into and accumulated rat prostate gland, and this finding culminated in the medication being repurposed for the treatment of prostate cancer. EMP was introduced for medical use in the treatment of this condition in the early 1970s, and was approved in the United States for this indication in 1981. EMP was originally introduced for use by intravenous injection. Subsequently, an oral formulation was introduced, and the intravenous preparation was almost abandoned in favor of the oral version.

== Society and culture ==
=== Generic names ===
EMP is provided as the sodium salt for oral administration, which has the generic names estramustine phosphate sodium (USAN) and estramustine sodium phosphate (BANM, JAN), and as the meglumine salt for intravenous administration, which has the generic name estramustine phosphate meglumine. The INNM is estramustine phosphate. The name estramustine phosphate is a contraction of estradiol normustine phosphate. EMP is also known by its former developmental code names Leo 299, Ro 21-8837, and Ro 21-8837/001.

=== Brand names ===
EMP is most commonly marketed under the brand names Estracyt and Emcyt, but has also been sold under a number of other brand names, including Amsupros, Biasetyl, Cellmustin, Estramustin HEXAL, Estramustina Filaxis, Estranovag, Multosin, Multosin Injekt, Proesta, Prostamustin, and Suloprost.

=== Availability ===
EMP is marketed in the United States, Canada, and Mexico under the brand name Emcyt, whereas the medication is marketed under the brand name Estracyt in the United Kingdom and elsewhere throughout Europe as well as in Argentina, Chile, and Hong Kong. It has been discontinued in a number of countries, including Australia, Brazil, Ireland, and Norway.

== Research ==
EMP has been studied in the treatment of other cancers such as glioma and breast cancer. It has been found to slightly improve quality of life in people with glioma during the first 3 months of therapy.
