= List of hormonal cytostatic antineoplastic agents =

Estramustine phosphate, the only dual hormonal and cytostatic antineoplastic agent to have been marketed. A normustine and phosphate ester of estradiol. Used in the treatment of prostate cancer.

This is a list of dual hormonal and cytostatic antineoplastic agents.

== Marketed ==
=== Estrogen-based ===
- Estramustine phosphate (Emcyt, Estracyt; Leo 299, NSC-89199, Ro 21-8837/001; estradiol 3-[bis(2-chloroethyl)carbamate] dihydrogen phosphate) – arrests anaphase stage of cell division

=== Corticosteroid-based ===
- Prednimustine (Mostarina, Sterecyst; chlorambucil prednisolone ester; prednisolone 21-(4-(4-(bis(2-chloroethyl)amino)phenyl)butanoate))

== Never marketed ==
=== Estrogen-based ===
- Alestramustine (estradiol 3-(bis(2-chloroethyl)carbamate) 17β-(L-alaninate))
- Atrimustine (bestrabucil, busramustine; KM-2210; estradiol 3-benzoate 17β-((4-(4-(bis(2-chloroethyl)amino)phenyl)-1-oxobutoxy)acetate)
- Cytestrol acetate (1α-hydroxyethinylestradiol 3-(bis(2-chloroethyl)carbamate) 11α,17β-diacetate)
- Estradiol mustard (NSC-112259; chlorphenacyl estradiol diester; estradiol 3,17β-bis(4-(bis(2-chloroethyl)amino)phenyl)acetate)
- Estramustine (Leo 275, Ro 21–8837; estradiol 3-(bis(2-chloroethyl)carbamate) ester)
- Estromustine (Leo 271 f; estrone-cytostatic complex; estrone 17β-3-N-bis(2-chloroethyl)carbamate)
- ICI-85966 (Stilbostat; diethylstilbestrol bis(di(2-chloroethyl)carbamate)
- Phenestrol (fenestrol; NSC-183736; hexestrol bis[4-[bis(2-chloroethyl)amino]phenylacetate)

=== Androgen-based ===
- LS-1727 (nandrolone 17β-N-(2-chloroethyl)-N-nitrosocarbamate)
- Sturamustine (dehydroepiandrosterone 17β-N-(2-chloroethyl)-N-nitrosourea)
- Testifenon (testiphenon, testiphenone; chlorphenacyl dihydrotestosterone ester; dihydrotestosterone 17β-(4-(bis(2-chloroethyl)amino)phenyl)acetate)

=== Corticosteroid-based ===
- Cortifen (cortiphen, kortifen, fencoron; chlorphenacyl 11-deoxycortisol ester; 11-deoxycortisol 21-(4-(bis(2-chloroethyl)amino)phenyl)acetate)
