= Estramustine =

Chemical compound

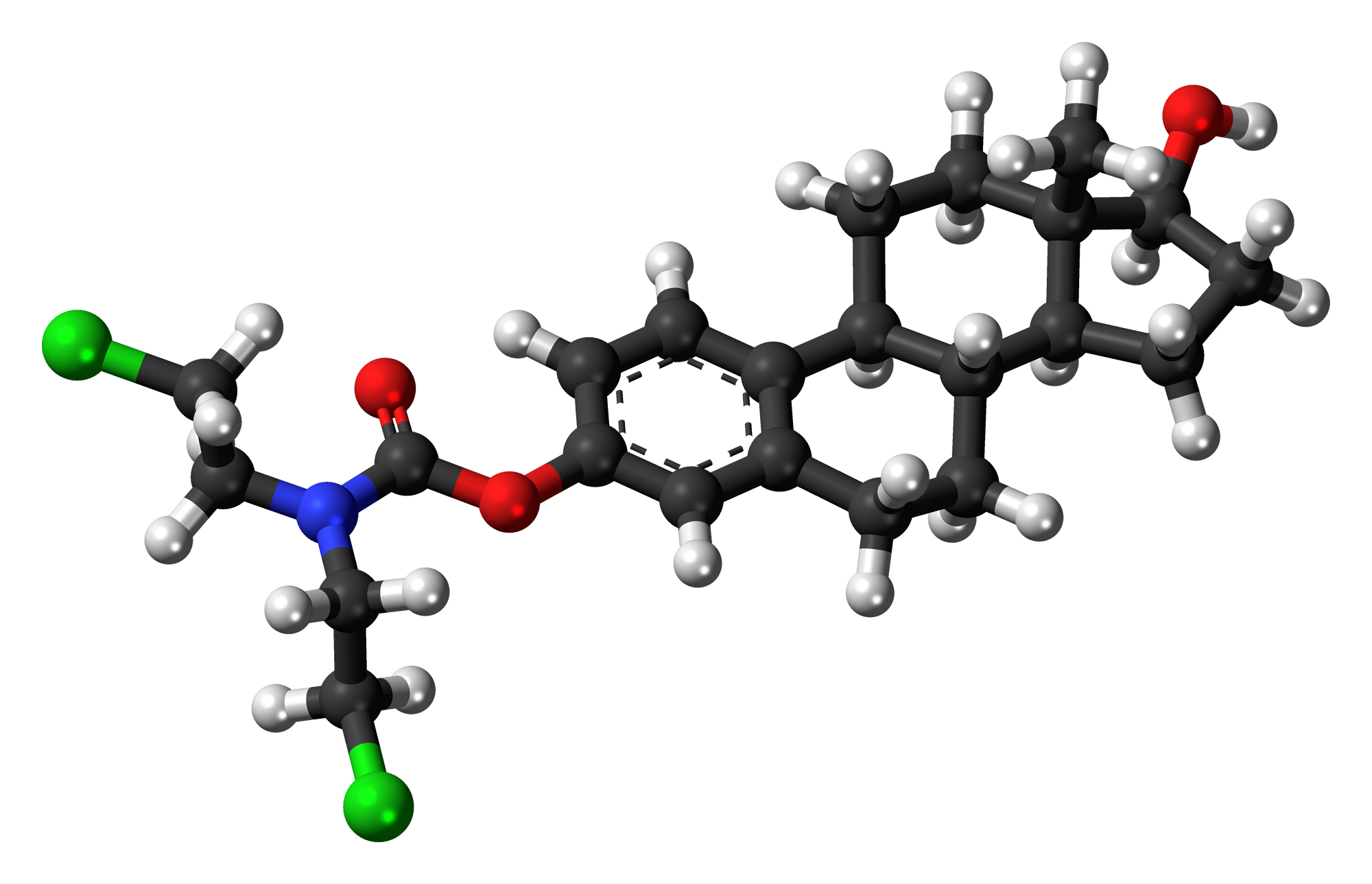

Clinical data
- Trade names: Emcyt, Estracyt
- Other names: EM; EaM; Leo 275; Ro 21-8837; Estradiol 3-(bis(2-chloroethyl)carbamate) ester; Estra-1,3,5(10)-triene-3,17β-diol 3-(bis(2-chloroethyl)carbamate) ester
- Drug class: Chemotherapeutic agent; Estrogen; Estrogen ester
- ATC code: L01XX11 (WHO)

Identifiers
- IUPAC name: [(8R,9S,13S,14S,17S)-17-hydroxy-13-methyl-6,7,8,9,11,12,14,15,16,17-decahydrocyclopenta[a]phenanthren-3-yl] N,N-bis(2-chloroethyl)carbamate
- CAS Number: 2998-57-4
- PubChem CID: 259331
- ChemSpider: 227635
- UNII: 35LT29625A
- KEGG: D04066
- ChEBI: CHEBI:4868
- ChEMBL: ChEMBL1575
- CompTox Dashboard (EPA): DTXSID8046458
- ECHA InfoCard: 100.019.161

Chemical and physical data
- Formula: C_{23}H_{31}Cl_{2}NO_{3}
- Molar mass: 440.41 g·mol^{−1}
- 3D model (JSmol): Interactive image
- SMILES: C[C@]12CC[C@H]3[C@H]([C@@H]1CC[C@@H]2O)CCC4=C3C=CC(=C4)OC(=O)N(CCCl)CCCl
- InChI: InChI=1S/C23H31Cl2NO3/c1-23-9-8-18-17-5-3-16(29-22(28)26(12-10-24)13-11-25)14-15(17)2-4-19(18)20(23)6-7-21(23)27/h3,5,14,18-21,27H,2,4,6-13H2,1H3/t18-,19-,20+,21+,23+/m1/s1; Key:FRPJXPJMRWBBIH-RBRWEJTLSA-N

Estramustine (INN, USAN, BAN) is an estrogen and cytostatic antineoplastic agent which was never marketed. It is a carbamate derivative of estradiol and acts in part as a prodrug of estradiol in the body. Estramustine phosphate, the C17β phosphate ester of estramustine and a prodrug of estramustine, estromustine, estradiol, and estrone, is marketed and used in the treatment of prostate cancer.

== Synthesis ==
Estramustine is a carbamate derivative of the natural hormone, estradiol. The amine (ClCH_{2}CH_{2})_{2}NH is treated with phosgene to give the acid chloride of normustine. This reacts with the phenolic hydroxyl group of estradiol in the presence of a base to give estramustine.

== See also ==
- Estradiol mustard
- List of hormonal cytostatic antineoplastic agents
- List of estrogen esters § Estradiol esters
