= Ligerin =

Names
- IUPAC name 4-[(1R,2S,3S,4R)-4-(chloromethyl)-4-hydroxy-2-methoxy-3-[(2R,3R)-2-methyl-3-(3-methylbut-2-enyl)oxiran-2-yl]cyclohexyl]oxy-4-oxobutanoic acid

Identifiers
3D model (JSmol)	Interactive image
ChEBI	CHEBI:207471
ChEMBL	ChEMBL2332344
ChemSpider	28637720
PubChem CID	66553197
- InChI: InChI=1S/C20H31ClO7/c1-12(2)5-6-14-19(3,28-14)18-17(26-4)13(9-10-20(18,25)11-21)27-16(24)8-7-15(22)23/h5,13-14,17-18,25H,6-11H2,1-4H3,(H,22,23)/t13-,14-,17-,18-,19+,20+/m1/s1 Key: FKTJAQKUCINAIF-JNYDFHNISA-N
- SMILES: CC(=CC[C@@H]1[C@@](O1)(C)[C@H]2[C@@H]([C@@H](CC[C@@]2(CCl)O)OC(=O)CCC(=O)O)OC)C

Properties
Chemical formula	C_{20}H_{31}ClO_{7}
Molar mass	418.91 g·mol^{−1}
- Except where otherwise noted, data are given for materials in their standard state (at 25 °C [77 °F], 100 kPa). Infobox references

Ligerin is an antiproliferative sesquiterpene with the molecular formula C_{20}H_{31}ClO_{7} which is produced by a Penicillium species.
