= Sturamustine =

Chemical compound

Clinical data
- Other names: Dehydroepiandrosterone (DHEA) 17β-N-(2-chloroethyl)-N-nitrosourea; N-(2-Chloroethyl)-N'-(3-hydroxyandrost-5-en-17-yl)-N-nitrosourea

Identifiers
- IUPAC name: N-(2-chloroethyl)-N'-[(3β,17β)-3-hydroxyandrost-5-en-17-yl]-N-nitrosocarbamimidic acid
- CAS Number: 81912-55-2
- ChemSpider: 57260288
- UNII: YBB6TJD2VC

Chemical and physical data
- Formula: C_{22}H_{34}ClN_{3}O_{3}
- Molar mass: 423.98 g·mol^{−1}
- 3D model (JSmol): Interactive image
- SMILES: C[C@]12CC[C@H]3[C@H]([C@@H]1CC[C@@H]2/N=C(/N(CCCl)N=O)\O)CC=C4[C@@]3(CC[C@@H](C4)O)C
- InChI: InChI=1S/C22H34ClN3O3/c1-21-9-7-15(27)13-14(21)3-4-16-17-5-6-19(22(17,2)10-8-18(16)21)24-20(28)26(25-29)12-11-23/h3,15-19,27H,4-13H2,1-2H3,(H,24,28)/t15-,16-,17-,18-,19-,21-,22-/m0/s1; Key:QSHCCJGNLACWQQ-UMWWKMARSA-N

Sturamustine, also known as dehydroepiandrosterone (DHEA) 17β-N-(2-chloroethyl)-N-nitrosourea, is a synthetic androstane steroid and a C17β nitrosourea conjugate of dehydroepiandrosterone (DHEA) which was developed as a cytostatic antineoplastic agent (i.e., a chemotherapy drug) for the treatment of hormone-dependent tumors but was never marketed. It was synthesized in 1982.

== See also ==
- List of hormonal cytostatic antineoplastic agents
- List of androgen esters
