= PMEG (antiviral) =

Names
- Preferred IUPAC name {[2-(2-Amino-6-oxo-1,6-dihydro-9H-purin-9-yl)ethoxy]methyl}phosphonic acid
- Other names 9-((2-Phosphonylmethoxy)ethyl)guanine

Identifiers
CAS Number	114088-58-3
3D model (JSmol)	Interactive image
ChemSpider	58514
ECHA InfoCard	100.208.448
PubChem CID	64989
UNII	N9YOI96LPP
CompTox Dashboard (EPA)	DTXSID90150649
- InChI: InChI=1S/C8H12N5O5P/c9-8-11-6-5(7(14)12-8)10-3-13(6)1-2-18-4-19(15,16)17/h3H,1-2,4H2,(H2,15,16,17)(H3,9,11,12,14) Key: NZVORGQIEFTOQZ-UHFFFAOYSA-N
- SMILES: c1nc2c(n1CCOCP(=O)(O)O)[nH]c(nc2=O)N

Properties
Chemical formula	C_{8}H_{12}N_{5}O_{5}P
Molar mass	289.188 g·mol^{−1}
- Except where otherwise noted, data are given for materials in their standard state (at 25 °C [77 °F], 100 kPa). Infobox references

PMEG (9-[2-(phosphonomethoxy)ethyl] guanine) is an acyclic nucleoside phosphonate. Acyclic nucleoside phosphonates can have significant antiviral, cytostatic and antiproliferative activities. PMEG can inhibit cell proliferation and cause genotoxicity. PMEG is active against leukemia and melanoma in animal tumor models, and also has antiviral activities against herpes viruses in murine models.

Successful application of PMEG and PMEG-derivatives analogs may depend on the development analogs with reduced toxicity and enhanced pharmacokinetic properties to tissues. There are no clinical trials using PMEG listed at clinicaltrials.gov. This suggests that the pharmacokinetic properties of PMEG were too toxic to process forward with. There are several different PMEG-derivatives analogs currently being investigated. GS-9191 and GS-9219 prodrugs are just two of the next generation PMEG compounds being evaluated for antiviral and anticancer activities. Both GS-9191 and GS-9219 have made it into clinical trials, but require additional study.

== Biology ==
Acyclic nucleoside phosphonates prodrugs require further phosphorylation in the cell in order to become the active metabolite. Once PMEG is phosphorylated into its triphosphate form, host or viral DNA polymerases can use it a substrate during DNA synthesis. Since it is an acyclic nucleoside, lacking a 3'-OH moiety, to further extension of the DNA strand occurs. Thus this agent uses the classical mechanism of DNA chain terminator. PMEG has often been cited for its antiviral activities.
