= LS-1727 =

Chemical compound

Clinical data
- Other names: LEO-1727; 19-Nortestosterone 17β-N-(2-chloroethyl)-N-nitrosocarbamate; Nandrolone chloroethylnitrosocarbamate
- Routes of administration: Intramuscular injection
- Drug class: Cytostatic antineoplastic agent; Androgen; Anabolic steroid; Androgen ester; Progestogen

Identifiers
- IUPAC name: [(8R,9S,10R,13S,14S,17S)-13-methyl-3-oxo-2,6,7,8,9,10,11,12,14,15,16,17-dodecahydro-1H-cyclopenta[a]phenanthren-17-yl] N-(2-chloroethyl)-N-nitrosocarbamate
- CAS Number: 54025-36-4
- PubChem CID: 320801
- ChemSpider: 283976
- CompTox Dashboard (EPA): DTXSID20968855

Chemical and physical data
- Formula: C_{21}H_{29}ClN_{2}O_{4}
- Molar mass: 408.92 g·mol^{−1}
- 3D model (JSmol): Interactive image
- SMILES: C[C@]12CC[C@H]3[C@H]([C@@H]1CC[C@@H]2OC(=O)N(CCCl)N=O)CCC4=CC(=O)CC[C@H]34
- InChI: InChI=1S/C21H29ClN2O4/c1-21-9-8-16-15-5-3-14(25)12-13(15)2-4-17(16)18(21)6-7-19(21)28-20(26)24(23-27)11-10-22/h12,15-19H,2-11H2,1H3/t15-,16+,17+,18-,19-,21-/m0/s1; Key:KTQUNVRSLAGBSY-RRFJAZBJSA-N

LS-1727 (also known as nandrolone 17β-N-(2-chloroethyl)-N-nitrosocarbamate) is a synthetic, injected anabolic–androgenic steroid (AAS) and a nitrosocarbamate ester of nandrolone (19-nortestosterone) which was developed as a cytostatic antineoplastic agent but was never marketed.

Relative affinities (%) of nandrolone and related steroids
Compound	PR	AR	ER	GR	MR	SHBG	CBG
Nandrolone	20	154–155	<0.1	0.5	1.6	1–16	0.1
Testosterone	1.0–1.2	100	<0.1	0.17	0.9	19–82	3–8
Estradiol	2.6	7.9	100	0.6	0.13	8.7–12	<0.1
Notes: Values are percentages (%). Reference ligands (100%) were progesterone for the PR, testosterone for the AR, estradiol for the ER, dexamethasone for the GR, aldosterone for the MR, dihydrotestosterone for SHBG, and cortisol for CBG. Sources: See template.

== See also ==
- List of hormonal cytostatic antineoplastic agents
- List of androgen esters § Nandrolone esters
