= Photokeratitis =

Eye condition caused by ultraviolet radiation

- Other names: Ultraviolet keratitis, snow blindness, arc eye, welder's flash, UV-induced keratitis
- Photokeratitis after being stained with fluorescein showing the characteristic small spots of uptake in the areas not typically covered by the eyelids
- Specialty: Ophthalmology
- Symptoms: Eye pain, redness, blurry vision, sensitivity to light
- Usual onset: 6 to 12 hrs
- Duration: 1 to 3 days
- Causes: Ultraviolet light (UV)
- Diagnostic method: Slit-lamp examination
- Differential diagnosis: Conjunctivitis, episcleritis, acute angle-closure glaucoma, acute anterior uveitis, superficial keratitis, corneal foreign body, dry eyes
- Prevention: Eye protection, avoiding direct sunlight, wearing a hat
- Treatment: No specific treatment required
- Medication: Lubricating eye drops, simple pain medication
- Prognosis: Generally good
- Frequency: Relatively common

Photokeratitis is a painful eye condition that typically results from short term, excessive ultraviolet (UV) exposure. Other symptoms include redness, blurry vision, and sensitivity to light. Onset is typically 6 to 12 hrs after exposure, with symptoms lasting for up to 3 days. It is similar to a sunburn of the eye.

The UV source can be either natural, such as direct or reflected sunlight or artificial like tanning beds or the electric arc during welding. Risk factors include skiing, mountaineering, and beach activities. It is specifically due to UV B and UV C wavelengths. It results in small areas of damage to the surface of the eye. Diagnosis maybe supported by the events around the onset and slit-lamp examination.

Prevention is by wearing eye protection, such as welding goggles, sunglasses, or snow goggles. Other measures including avoiding direct sunlight and wearing a hat. While no specific treatment is required, lubricating eye drops, simple pain medication, and medications to relax the pupil may be used. Use of contacts should be avoided until better. Outcomes are generally good.

Photokeratitis is relatively common; thought its exact frequency is unclear. It occurs more commonly near the poles and at high elevations. The condition has been known since ancient history. It is also known by common names such as "snow blindness" and "welder's flash".

== Signs and symptoms ==
Slit-lamp microscopy of photokeratitis

Common symptoms include pain, intense tears, eyelid twitching (blepharospasm), discomfort (photophobia) from bright light, and constricted pupils.

== Cause ==
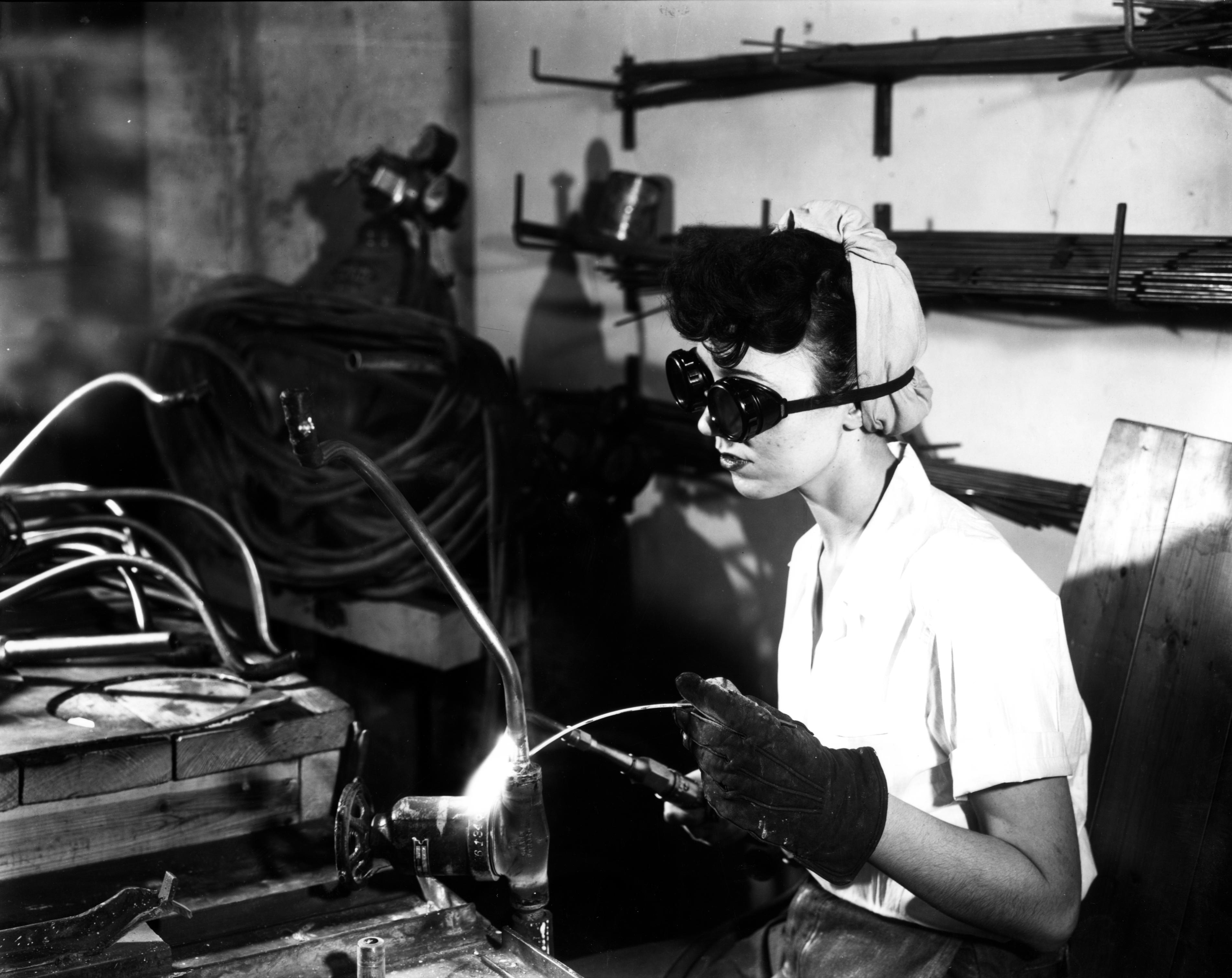
The arc flash from welding is a common cause of photokeratitis. The welder here is wearing eye protection.

Any intense exposure to UV light can lead to photokeratitis. In 2010, the Department of Optometry at the Dublin Institute of Technology published that the threshold for photokeratitis is 0.12 J/m^{2}. (Prior to this, in 1975, the Division of Biological Effects at the United States Bureau of Radiological Health had published that the human threshold for photokeratitis is 50 J/m^{2}.) Common causes include welding with failure to use adequate eye protection such as an appropriate welding helmet or welding goggles. This is termed arc eye, while photokeratitis caused by exposure to sunlight reflected from ice and snow, particularly at elevation, is commonly called snow blindness. It can also occur due to using tanning beds without proper eyewear. Natural sources include bright sunlight reflected from snow or ice or, less commonly, from sea or sand. Fresh snow reflects about 80% of the UV radiation compared to a dry, sandy beach (15%) or sea foam (25%). This is especially a problem in polar regions and at high altitudes, as with about every 300 m (980 ft) of elevation (above sea level), the intensity of ultraviolet rays increases by four percent.

== Diagnosis ==
Fluorescein dye staining will reveal damage to the cornea under ultraviolet light.

== Prevention ==
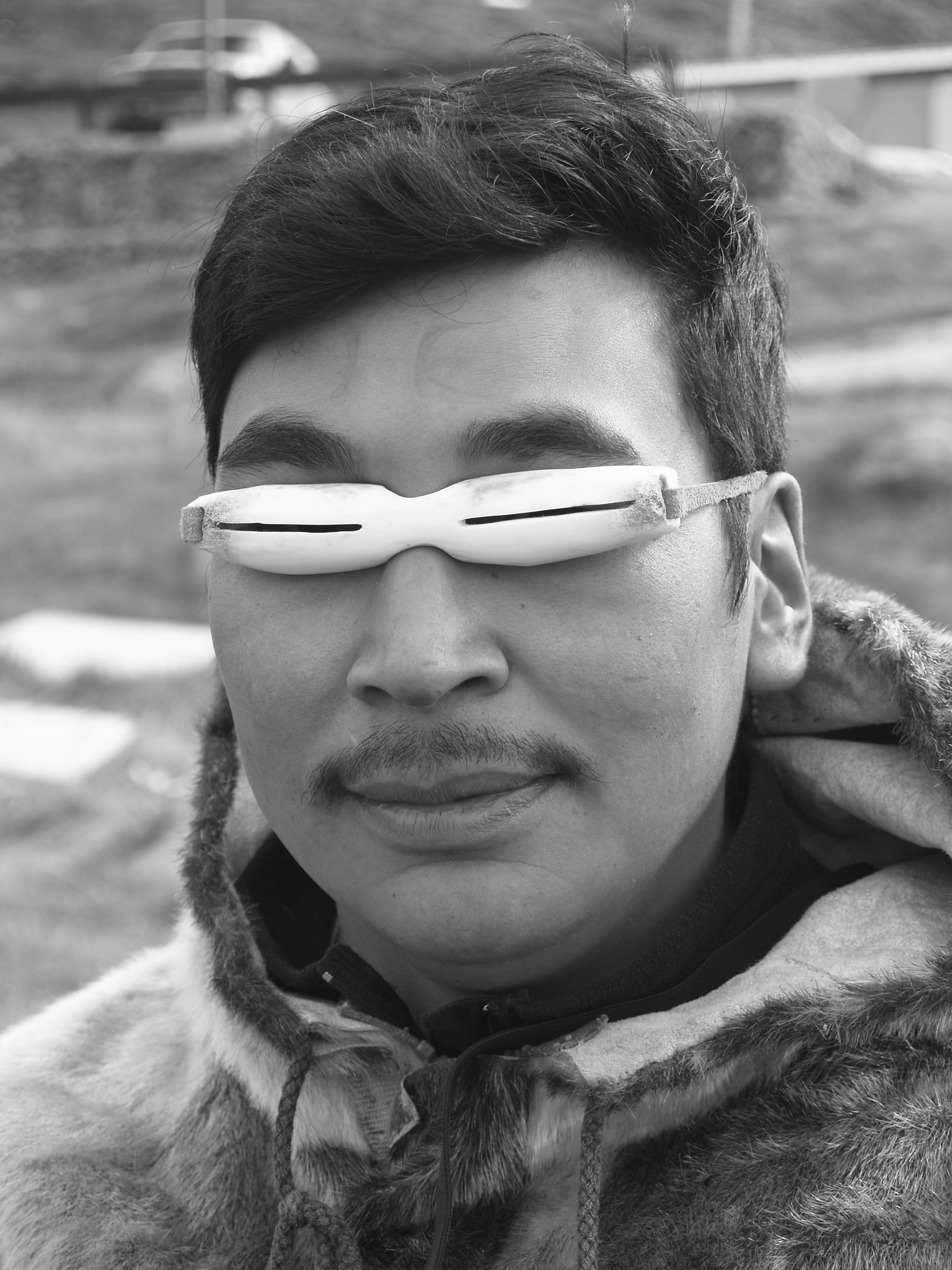
Snow goggles traditionally used by the Inuit

Photokeratitis can be prevented by using sunglasses or eye protection that transmits 5–10% of visible light and absorbs almost all UV rays. Additionally, these glasses should have large lenses and side shields to avoid incidental light exposure. Sunglasses should always be worn, even when the sky is overcast, as UV rays can pass through clouds.

Inuit, Yupik, and other circumpolar peoples have carved snow goggles from materials such as driftwood or antlers of caribou to help prevent snow blindness for millennia. Curved to fit the user's face with a large groove cut in the back to allow for the nose, the goggles allow in a small amount of light through a long thin slit cut along their length. The goggles are held to the head by a cord made of sinew.

In the event of missing sunglass lenses, emergency lenses can be made by cutting slits in dark fabric or tape folded back onto itself. The SAS Survival Guide recommends blackening the skin underneath the eyes with charcoal (as the ancient Egyptians did) to avoid any further reflection.

=== Polar explorers ===
Explorers of the polar regions employed various methods and materials to protect their eyes from the harsh glare in snowy environments. Edward Evans noted the popularity of yellow and orange-tinted glasses among explorers, though some showed a preference for green. Despite the availability of blue and purple glasses, Edward L. Atkinson advised that all glasses, regardless of colour, should undergo spectroscope testing to ensure effectiveness.

Robert Falcon Scott favoured a more rudimentary approach, opting for goggles crafted from leather or wood with narrow slits, which prevented the accumulation of frost. A similar design principle was also applied in emergency situations, such as when the Swedish expedition, after being shipwrecked, fashioned makeshift goggles from wood or wire frames covered with fabric from a Swedish flag.

The Royal Geographical Society's guidance for travellers included a technique used by indigenous peoples of high-altitude regions, which involved darkening the skin around the eyes and nose to mitigate the risk. This method was adopted by the north party of the Terra Nova Expedition in the absence of traditional goggles.

The impact of snow blindness extended to animals as well; the expedition's horses suffered from the condition. Lawrence Oates proposed dyeing the horses' forelocks as a preventative measure, and they were also equipped with tassels over their eyes for protection. Similarly, mules were provided with canvas snow goggles, demonstrating the breadth of strategies developed to combat this pervasive issue during polar exploration.

== Treatment ==
The pain may be temporarily alleviated with anaesthetic eye drops for the examination; however, they are not generally continued, due to the concern excessive use may lead to corneal ulceration.

Cool, wet compresses over the eyes and artificial tears may help local symptoms when the feeling returns. Nonsteroidal anti-inflammatory drug (NSAID) eye drops are widely used to lessen inflammation and eye pain, but have not been proven in rigorous trials. Systemic (oral) pain medication is given if discomfort is severe. Healing is usually rapid (24–72 hours) if the injury source is removed. Further injury should be avoided by isolation in a dark room, removing contact lenses, not rubbing the eyes, and wearing sunglasses until the symptoms improve.

== History ==
In the 1900s polar explorers dripped cocaine into the eye in an effort to address the condition.

== See also ==
- Actinic conjunctivitis – Inflammation of the conjunctiva by ultraviolet damage
- Eye black – Glare reducer
- Glare (vision) – Bright light which impairs vision
- Health effects of sunlight exposure
- Light pollution – Excess artificial light in an environment
- Photic retinopathy – Damage to the retina from intense sources of light
