= Testifenon =

Chemical compound

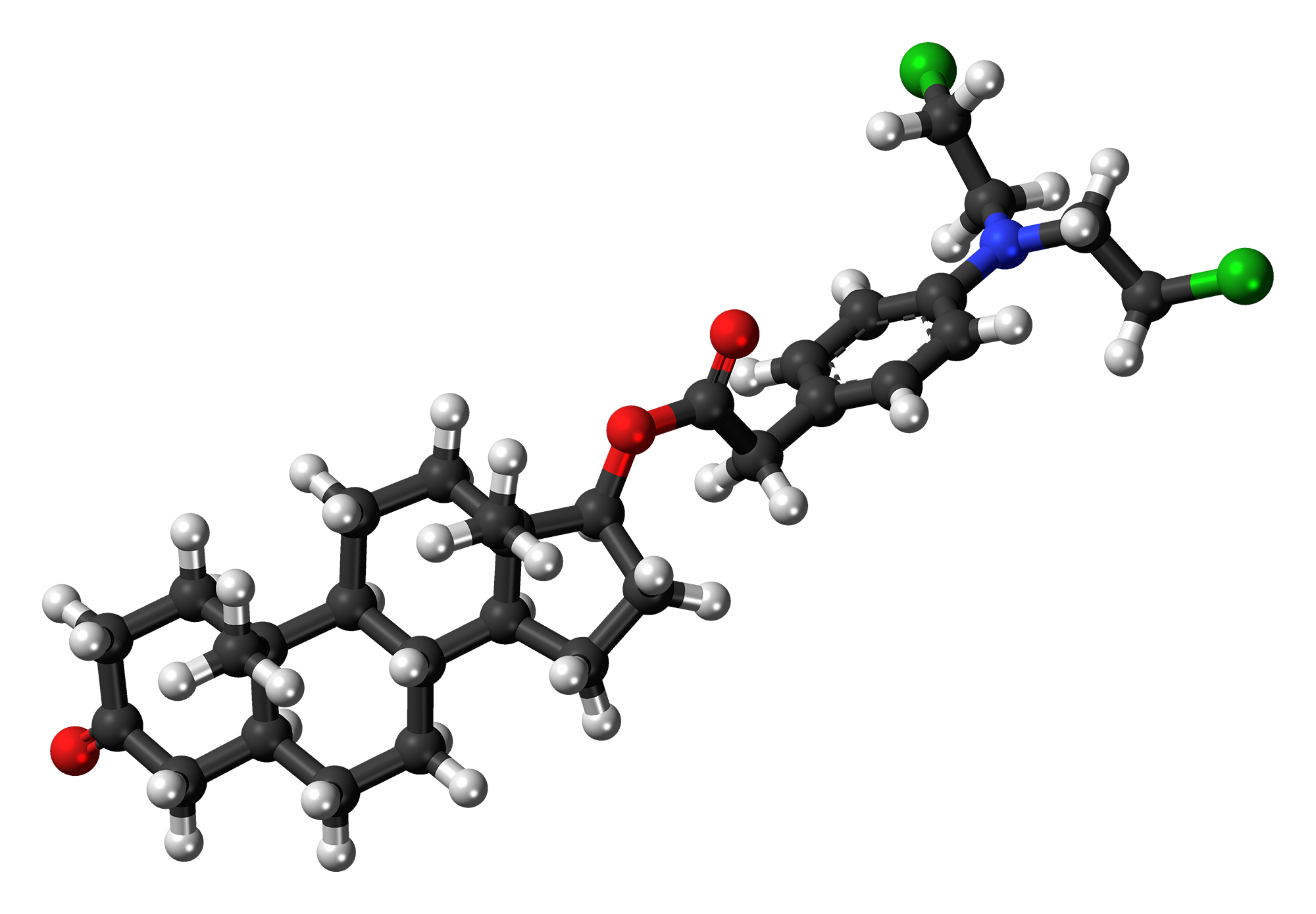

Clinical data
- Other names: Testiphenon; Testiphenone; Chlorphenacyl dihydrotestosterone ester; Dihydrotestosterone 17β-(4-(bis(2-chloroethyl)amino)phenyl)acetate; LS-19378

Identifiers
- IUPAC name: [(5S,8R,9S,10S,13S,14S,17S)-10,13-Dimethyl-3-oxo-1,2,4,5,6,7,8,9,11,12,14,15,16,17-tetradecahydrocyclopenta[a]phenanthren-17-yl] 2-[4-[bis(2-chloroethyl)amino]phenyl]acetate
- CAS Number: 104730-58-7
- PubChem CID: 128659
- ChemSpider: 114020
- UNII: 3U50JYF0B9
- CompTox Dashboard (EPA): DTXSID10909156

Chemical and physical data
- Formula: C_{31}H_{43}Cl_{2}NO_{3}
- Molar mass: 548.59 g·mol^{−1}
- 3D model (JSmol): Interactive image
- SMILES: C[C@]12CCC(=O)C[C@@H]1CC[C@@H]3[C@@H]2CC[C@]4([C@H]3CC[C@@H]4OC(=O)CC5=CC=C(C=C5)N(CCCl)CCCl)C
- InChI: InChI=1S/C31H43Cl2NO3/c1-30-13-11-24(35)20-22(30)5-8-25-26-9-10-28(31(26,2)14-12-27(25)30)37-29(36)19-21-3-6-23(7-4-21)34(17-15-32)18-16-33/h3-4,6-7,22,25-28H,5,8-20H2,1-2H3/t22-,25-,26-,27-,28-,30-,31-/m0/s1; Key:JWLXQUMDRGJLMS-SJQIPMMSSA-N

Testifenon, also known as testiphenon, testiphenone, chlorphenacyl dihydrotestosterone ester, or dihydrotestosterone 17β-(4-(bis(2-chloroethyl)amino)phenyl)acetate, is a synthetic anabolic–androgenic steroid (AAS) and a cytostatic antineoplastic agent (i.e., chemotherapeutic) that was never marketed. It is an androgen ester – specifically, a chlorphenacyl nitrogen mustard ester of dihydrotestosterone (DHT) – and acts as a prodrug of these two components in the body. The drug was developed in Russia as a tissue-selective cytostatic drug for the treatment of various cancers occurring in androgen receptor-expressing tissues that would have reduced side effects and toxicity relative to other chemotherapy drugs.

== See also ==
- List of hormonal cytostatic antineoplastic agents
- List of androgen esters § Dihydrotestosterone esters
- List of Russian drugs
