= Alestramustine =

Chemical compound

Clinical data
- Other names: Alanylestramustine; Estradiol 3-(bis(2-chloroethyl)carbamate) 17β-(L-alaninate); Estradiol 3-(bis(2-chloroethyl)carbamate) 17β-(2β-aminopropanoate); Estradiol 3-(bis(2-chloroethyl)carbamate) 17β-((2S)-2-aminopropanoate)
- Drug class: Chemotherapeutic agent; Estrogen; Estrogen ester

Identifiers
- IUPAC name: [(8R,9S,13S,14S,17S)-3-[bis(2-Chloroethyl)carbamoyloxy]-13-methyl-6,7,8,9,11,12,14,15,16,17-decahydrocyclopenta[a]phenanthren-17-yl] (2S)-2-aminopropanoate
- CAS Number: 139402-18-9
- PubChem CID: 20055302
- ChemSpider: 16736564
- UNII: 81U8A51CHK
- ChEMBL: ChEMBL2106670
- CompTox Dashboard (EPA): DTXSID201045221

Chemical and physical data
- Formula: C_{26}H_{36}Cl_{2}N_{2}O_{4}
- Molar mass: 511.48 g·mol^{−1}
- 3D model (JSmol): Interactive image
- SMILES: CC(C(=O)OC1CCC2C1(CCC3C2CCC4=C3C=CC(=C4)OC(=O)N(CCCl)CCCl)C)N
- InChI: InChI=1S/C26H36Cl2N2O4/c1-16(29)24(31)34-23-8-7-22-21-5-3-17-15-18(33-25(32)30(13-11-27)14-12-28)4-6-19(17)20(21)9-10-26(22,23)2/h4,6,15-16,20-23H,3,5,7-14,29H2,1-2H3/t16-,20+,21+,22-,23-,26-/m0/s1; Key:NRUFLTXGIPFVSH-KBVRNWHJSA-N

Alestramustine (INN), also known as estradiol 3-(bis(2-chloroethyl)carbamate) 17β-(L-alaninate), is a cytostatic antineoplastic agent which was never marketed. It is the L-alanine ester of estramustine, which is a combination of the nitrogen mustard normustine coupled via a carbamate to the estrogen estradiol. Alestramustine acts as a prodrug to estramustine, and also forms estradiol as a byproduct. The drug, via its active metabolites, binds to microtubule-associated proteins and β-tubulin and interferes with microtubule function, thereby inhibiting cell division. Due to its estrogen moiety, alestramustine is selectively concentrated in estrogen receptor-positive cells such as prostate and breast.

== See also ==
- List of hormonal cytostatic antineoplastic agents
- List of estrogen esters § Estradiol esters
