= Estromustine =

Chemical compound

Clinical data
- Other names: EoM; Leo 271 f; Estrone 17β-3-N-bis(2-chloroethyl)carbamate; Estrone–cytostatic complex
- Drug class: Chemotherapeutic agent; Estrogen; Estrogen ester

Pharmacokinetic data
- Elimination half-life: 14 hours

Identifiers
- IUPAC name: [(8R,9S,13S,14S)-13-Methyl-17-oxo-7,8,9,11,12,14,15,16-octahydro-6H-cyclopenta[a]phenanthren-3-yl] N,N-bis(2-chloroethyl)carbamate
- CAS Number: 62899-40-5
- PubChem CID: 124946
- ChemSpider: 111241
- CompTox Dashboard (EPA): DTXSID40978673

Chemical and physical data
- Formula: C_{23}H_{29}Cl_{2}NO_{3}
- Molar mass: 438.39 g·mol^{−1}
- 3D model (JSmol): Interactive image
- SMILES: C[C@]12CC[C@H]3[C@H]([C@@H]1CCC2=O)CCC4=C3C=CC(=C4)OC(=O)N(CCCl)CCCl
- InChI: InChI=1S/C23H29Cl2NO3/c1-23-9-8-18-17-5-3-16(29-22(28)26(12-10-24)13-11-25)14-15(17)2-4-19(18)20(23)6-7-21(23)27/h3,5,14,18-20H,2,4,6-13H2,1H3/t18-,19-,20+,23+/m1/s1; Key:AXWYROHIFVWHMR-UGTOYMOASA-N

Estromustine (developmental code name Leo 271 f), also known as estrone 17β-3-N-bis(2-chloroethyl)carbamate or estrone–cytostatic complex, is a major active metabolite of the cytostatic antineoplastic agent and estrogen estramustine phosphate, a medication used in the treatment of prostate cancer.

== See also ==
- List of hormonal cytostatic antineoplastic agents
- List of estrogen esters § Estradiol esters
