= Normustine =

Nitrogen mustard used as a chemotherapy agent

Clinical data
- Other names: Bis(2-chloroethyl)carbamic acid

Identifiers
- IUPAC name: Bis(2-chloroethyl)carbamic acid
- CAS Number: 78619-95-1
- PubChem CID: 18377863
- UNII: Q2KPX8TH4K
- CompTox Dashboard (EPA): DTXSID701337180

Chemical and physical data
- Formula: C_{5}H_{9}Cl_{2}NO_{2}
- Molar mass: 186.03 g·mol^{−1}
- 3D model (JSmol): Interactive image
- SMILES: C(CCl)N(CCCl)C(=O)O
- InChI: InChI=1S/C5H9Cl2NO2/c6-1-3-8(4-2-7)5(9)10/h1-4H2,(H,9,10); Key:TTYAKTJQJVVKED-UHFFFAOYSA-N

Normustine, also known as bis(2-chloroethyl)carbamic acid, is a nitrogen mustard and alkylating antineoplastic agent (i.e., chemotherapy agent). It is a metabolite of a number of antineoplastic agents that have been developed for the treatment of tumors, including estramustine phosphate, alestramustine, cytestrol acetate, and ICI-85966 (stilbostat), but only the former of which has actually been marketed.
