= Atrimustine =

Chemical compound

Clinical data
- Other names: Bestrabucil; Busramustine; KM-2210; Kregan; Estradiol 3-benzoate 17β-((4-(4-(bis(2-chloroethyl)amino)phenyl)-1-oxobutoxy)acetate; 3-Benzoyl-17β-((4-(4-(bis(2-chloroethyl)amino)phenyl)-1-oxobutoxy)acetylestradiol
- Drug class: Chemotherapeutic agent; Estrogen; Estrogen ester

Identifiers
- IUPAC name: [(8R,9S,13S,14S,17S)-17-[2-[4-[4-[bis(2-chloroethyl)amino]phenyl]butanoyloxy]acetyl]oxy-13-methyl-6,7,8,9,11,12,14,15,16,17-decahydrocyclopenta[a]phenanthren-3-yl] benzoate
- CAS Number: 75219-46-4
- PubChem CID: 6917688
- ChemSpider: 5292918
- UNII: XC0K09B7K4
- ChEMBL: ChEMBL2106381
- CompTox Dashboard (EPA): DTXSID501046416

Chemical and physical data
- Formula: C_{41}H_{47}Cl_{2}NO_{6}
- Molar mass: 720.73 g·mol^{−1}
- 3D model (JSmol): Interactive image
- SMILES: C[C@]12CC[C@H]3[C@@H](CCc4cc(OC(=O)c5ccccc5)ccc34)[C@@H]1CC[C@@H]2OC(=O)COC(=O)CCCc6ccc(cc6)N(CCCl)CCCl
- InChI: InChI=1S/C41H47Cl2NO6/c1-41-21-20-34-33-17-15-32(49-40(47)29-7-3-2-4-8-29)26-30(33)12-16-35(34)36(41)18-19-37(41)50-39(46)27-48-38(45)9-5-6-28-10-13-31(14-11-28)44(24-22-42)25-23-43/h2-4,7-8,10-11,13-15,17,26,34-37H,5-6,9,12,16,18-25,27H2,1H3/t34-,35-,36+,37+,41+/m1/s1; Key:IFJUINDAXYAPTO-UUBSBJJBSA-N

Atrimustine (INN) (developmental code name KM-2210; former tentative brand name Kregan), also known as bestrabucil or busramustine, is a cytostatic antineoplastic agent which was under development in Japan by Kureha Chemicals (now Kureha Corporation) for the treatment of breast cancer and non-Hodgkin's lymphoma as well as for the prevention of graft-versus-host disease in bone marrow transplant recipients. It is the benzoate ester of an ester conjugate of estradiol and chlorambucil, which results in targeted/site-directed cytostatic activity toward estrogen receptor–positive tissues such as breast and bone. It reached preregistration for the treatment of cancer but was ultimately discontinued. Estrogenicic side effects of atrimustine in clinical trials included vaginal bleeding and gynecomastia. The drug was first patented in 1980.

== See also ==
- List of hormonal cytostatic antineoplastic agents
- List of estrogen esters § Estradiol esters
