= Cytestrol acetate =

Chemical compound

Clinical data
- Other names: 11α-Hydroxyethinylestradiol 3-(bis(2-chloroethyl)carbamate) 11α,17β-diacetate; 17α-Ethynylestra-1,3,5(10)-triene-3,11α,17β-triol 11α,17β-diacetate 3-(bis(2-chloroethyl)carbamate)

Identifiers
- IUPAC name: (1S,10S,11S,14R,15S,17R)-17-(Acetyloxy)-5-{[bis(2-chloroethyl)carbamoyl]oxy}-14-ethynyl-15-methyltetracyclo[8.7.0.0^{2,7}.0^{11,15}]heptadeca-2,4,6-trien-14-yl acetate
- PubChem CID: 165360213
- ChemSpider: 58838619

Chemical and physical data
- Formula: C_{29}H_{35}Cl_{2}NO_{6}
- Molar mass: 564.50 g·mol^{−1}
- 3D model (JSmol): Interactive image
- SMILES: [H][C@@]12CC[C@@](OC(C)=O)(C#C)[C@@]1(C)C[C@@H](OC(C)=O)[C@]1([H])C3=CC=C(OC(=O)N(CCCl)CCCl)C=C3CC[C@@]21[H]
- InChI: InChI=1S/C29H35Cl2NO6/c1-5-29(38-19(3)34)11-10-24-23-8-6-20-16-21(37-27(35)32(14-12-30)15-13-31)7-9-22(20)26(23)25(36-18(2)33)17-28(24,29)4/h1,7,9,16,23-26H,6,8,10-15,17H2,2-4H3/t23-,24-,25+,26+,28-,29-/m0/s1; Key:RRJRVDYYFLBGSE-UPRLNUCLSA-N

Cytestrol acetate is a steroidal antiestrogen and a cytostatic antineoplastic agent (i.e., chemotherapeutic) which was developed for the treatment of breast cancer but was never marketed.

It is an 11α-hydroxylated derivative of ethinylestradiol in which a bis(2-chloroethyl)amine nitrogen mustard moiety has been attached as an ester at the C3 position and acetate esters have been attached at the C11α and C17β positions. The mechanism of action of cytestrol acetate in breast cancer is two-fold: (1) acting as an antiestrogen similarly to fulvestrant or ICI-164384; and (2) having cytostatic actions via the carbamate–nitrogen mustard moiety analogously to estramustine phosphate. The drug shows potent efficacy against breast cancer superior to that of tamoxifen in in vitro models.

== See also ==
- List of hormonal cytostatic antineoplastic agents
- List of Russian drugs
