= Phenestrol =

Chemical compound

Clinical data
- Other names: Fenestrol; NSC-183736; hexestrol bis[4-[bis(2-chloroethyl)amino]phenylacetate

Identifiers
- IUPAC name: [4-[4-[4-[2-[4-[Bis(2-chloroethyl)amino]phenyl]acetyl]oxyphenyl]hexan-3-yl]phenyl] 2-[4-[bis(2-chloroethyl)amino]phenyl]acetate
- CAS Number: 19659-38-2
- PubChem CID: 161290
- ChemSpider: 141682
- CompTox Dashboard (EPA): DTXSID60941425

Chemical and physical data
- Formula: C_{42}H_{48}Cl_{4}N_{2}O_{4}
- Molar mass: 786.66 g·mol^{−1}
- 3D model (JSmol): Interactive image
- SMILES: CCC(C1=CC=C(C=C1)OC(=O)CC2=CC=C(C=C2)N(CCCl)CCCl)C(CC)C3=CC=C(C=C3)OC(=O)CC4=CC=C(C=C4)N(CCCl)CCCl
- InChI: InChI=1S/C42H48Cl4N2O4/c1-3-39(33-9-17-37(18-10-33)51-41(49)29-31-5-13-35(14-6-31)47(25-21-43)26-22-44)40(4-2)34-11-19-38(20-12-34)52-42(50)30-32-7-15-36(16-8-32)48(27-23-45)28-24-46/h5-20,39-40H,3-4,21-30H2,1-2H3; Key:GTWGWCYJKHSRHO-UHFFFAOYSA-N

Phenestrol, or fenestrol, also known as hexestrol bis[4-[bis(2-chloroethyl)amino]phenylacetate, is a synthetic, nonsteroidal estrogen and cytostatic antineoplastic agent (i.e., chemotherapy drug) and a chlorphenacyl nitrogen mustard ester of hexestrol which was developed in the early 1960s for the treatment of hormone-dependent tumors but was never marketed.

== See also ==
- List of hormonal cytostatic antineoplastic agents
- List of estrogen esters
