= Estradiol mustard =

Chemical compound

Clinical data
- Other names: NSC-112259; Estradiol 3,17β-bis(4-(bis(2-chloroethyl)amino)phenyl)acetate
- Drug class: Chemotherapeutic agent; Estrogen; Estrogen ester

Identifiers
- IUPAC name: [(8R,9S,13S,14S,17S)-3-[2-[4-[Bis(2-chloroethyl)amino]phenyl]acetyl]oxy-13-methyl-6,7,8,9,11,12,14,15,16,17-decahydrocyclopenta[a]phenanthren-17-yl] 2-[4-[bis(2-chloroethyl)amino]phenyl]acetate
- CAS Number: 22966-79-6
- PubChem CID: 31586
- ChemSpider: 29294
- UNII: GEO3F3A4K1
- ChEBI: CHEBI:82520
- ChEMBL: ChEMBL1697793
- CompTox Dashboard (EPA): DTXSID5020574

Chemical and physical data
- Formula: C_{42}H_{50}Cl_{4}N_{2}O_{4}
- Molar mass: 788.67 g·mol^{−1}
- 3D model (JSmol): Interactive image
- SMILES: C[C@]12CC[C@H]3[C@H]([C@@H]1CC[C@@H]2OC(=O)CC4=CC=C(C=C4)N(CCCl)CCCl)CCC5=C3C=CC(=C5)OC(=O)CC6=CC=C(C=C6)N(CCCl)CCCl
- InChI: InChI=1S/C42H50Cl4N2O4/c1-42-17-16-36-35-13-11-34(51-40(49)26-29-2-7-32(8-3-29)47(22-18-43)23-19-44)28-31(35)6-12-37(36)38(42)14-15-39(42)52-41(50)27-30-4-9-33(10-5-30)48(24-20-45)25-21-46/h2-5,7-11,13,28,36-39H,6,12,14-27H2,1H3/t36-,37-,38+,39+,42+/m1/s1; Key:LRSFXIJGHRPOQQ-VZRQQIPSSA-N

Estradiol mustard, also known as estradiol 3,17β-bis(4-(bis(2-chloroethyl)amino)phenyl)acetate, is a semisynthetic, steroidal estrogen and cytostatic antineoplastic agent and a phenylacetic acid nitrogen mustard-coupled estrogen ester that was never marketed. It is selectively distributed into estrogen receptor (ER)-positive tissues such as ER-expressing tumors like those seen in breast and prostate cancers. For this reason, estradiol mustard and other cytostatic-linked estrogens like estramustine phosphate have reduced toxicity relative to non-linked nitrogen mustard cytostatic antineoplastic agents. However, they may stimulate breast tumor growth due to their inherent estrogenic activity and are said to be devoid of major therapeutic efficacy in breast cancer, although estramustine phosphate has been approved for and is used (almost exclusively) in the treatment of prostate cancer.

== See also ==
- List of hormonal cytostatic antineoplastic agents
- List of estrogen esters § Estradiol esters
