= Cortifen =

Chemical compound

Clinical data
- Other names: Cortiphen; Kortifen; Fencoron; 11-Deoxycortisol 21-(4-(bis(2-chloroethyl)amino)phenyl)acetate; 11-Desoxy-17α-hydroxy-21-[n-di-2(chlorethyl)aminophenyl acetate]corticosterone
- Drug class: Cytostatic antineoplastic agent; Corticosteroid; Glucocorticoid

Identifiers
- IUPAC name: [2-[(8R,9S,10R,13S,14S,17R)-17-hydroxy-10,13-dimethyl-3-oxo-2,6,7,8,9,11,12,14,15,16-decahydro-1H-cyclopenta[a]phenanthren-17-yl]-2-oxoethyl] 2-[4-[bis(2-chloroethyl)amino]phenyl]acetate
- PubChem CID: 9873581
- ChemSpider: 8049270

Chemical and physical data
- Formula: C_{33}H_{43}Cl_{2}NO_{5}
- Molar mass: 604.61 g·mol^{−1}
- 3D model (JSmol): Interactive image
- SMILES: C[C@]12CCC(=O)C=C1CC[C@@H]3[C@@H]2CC[C@]4([C@H]3CC[C@@]4(C(=O)COC(=O)CC5=CC=C(C=C5)N(CCCl)CCCl)O)C
- InChI: InChI=1S/C33H43Cl2NO5/c1-31-12-9-25(37)20-23(31)5-8-26-27(31)10-13-32(2)28(26)11-14-33(32,40)29(38)21-41-30(39)19-22-3-6-24(7-4-22)36(17-15-34)18-16-35/h3-4,6-7,20,26-28,40H,5,8-19,21H2,1-2H3/t26-,27+,28+,31+,32+,33+/m1/s1; Key:PHIDEGNDCDIEQX-LNPWAVATSA-N

Cortifen, also known as cortiphen or kortifen, as well as fencoron, is a synthetic glucocorticoid corticosteroid and antineoplastic agent which was developed in Russia for potential treatment of tumors. It is a hydrophobic chlorphenacyl nitrogen mustard ester of 11-deoxycortisol (cortodoxone).

== See also ==
- List of hormonal cytostatic antineoplastic agents
- List of corticosteroid esters
- List of Russian drugs
