= ICI-85966 =

Chemical compound

Clinical data
- Other names: Stilbostat; Diethylstilbestrol (DES) bis(di(2-chloroethyl)carbamate)

Identifiers
- IUPAC name: [4-[(E)-4-[4-[Bis(2-chloroethyl)carbamoyloxy]phenyl]hex-3-en-3-yl]phenyl] N,N-bis(2-chloroethyl)carbamate
- CAS Number: 15470-58-3
- PubChem CID: 3037081
- ChemSpider: 2300916
- UNII: VUD64CLJ7Z
- CompTox Dashboard (EPA): DTXSID301046846

Chemical and physical data
- Formula: C_{28}H_{34}Cl_{4}N_{2}O_{4}
- Molar mass: 604.39 g·mol^{−1}
- 3D model (JSmol): Interactive image
- SMILES: CC/C(=C(/CC)\C1=CC=C(C=C1)OC(=O)N(CCCl)CCCl)/C2=CC=C(C=C2)OC(=O)N(CCCl)CCCl
- InChI: InChI=1S/C28H34Cl4N2O4/c1-3-25(21-5-9-23(10-6-21)37-27(35)33(17-13-29)18-14-30)26(4-2)22-7-11-24(12-8-22)38-28(36)34(19-15-31)20-16-32/h5-12H,3-4,13-20H2,1-2H3/b26-25+; Key:BOIZOYRDXIYMCY-OCEACIFDSA-N

ICI-85966 (former tentative brand name Stilbostat), also known as diethylstilbestrol (DES) bis(di(2-chloroethyl)carbamate), is a synthetic, nonsteroidal estrogen and cytostatic antineoplastic agent of the stilbestrol group and a nitrogen mustard ester of diethylstilbestrol (DES) which was developed for the treatment of breast cancer and prostate cancer but was never marketed (possibly due to the toxicity of DES).

== See also ==
- List of hormonal cytostatic antineoplastic agents
- List of estrogen esters
