= Eye pain =

Medical symptom

Eye pain, also called ophthomalgia or ocular pain, is a nonspecific term for pain in one or both eyes, around the eyes, or behind the eyes. It may encompass minor eye irritation, aching, or burning sensation to intense and prolonged pain. Eye pain is a common complaint and a major driver of patient visits to both emergency departments and out-patient clinics, generally ophthalmology or neurology clinics. Between 2008 and 2019, there were 1 million emergency department visits and 4.6 million outpatient visits attributed to eye pain.

Pain can occur in almost any part of the eye, including the eyelid, conjunctiva, sclera, cornea, or orbit (eye socket). Sensation of pain may be accompanied with swelling, throbbing or pressure, a stabbing or shooting pain, and/or the sensation of a foreign body in the eye. Damage to the cornea (corneal abrasion, corneal laceration, or corneal ulcer) can be serious and often painful, and may be caused by a sharp object or forceful impact.

Eye pain may be associated with a number of causes, which can be benign or vision- or life-threatening. To diagnose the cause, a healthcare provider will conduct a complete eye exam. Eye pain is common after viral or bacterial infection, eye surgery, or eye injury. Pain may also be associated with dirty contact lenses, increased intraocular pressure, exposure to toxins (such as air pollutants, cigarette smoke, or chlorine in a swimming pool), or allergies. Other conditions that contribute to eye pain include glaucoma, migraine, cluster headache, chalazion, or stye. A 2018 study that examined 2,407 patients across different countries found that inflammatory eye disease (such as conjunctivitis, blepharitis, keratitis, uveitis, dry eye syndrome, chalazion, and scleritis) was the predominant cause of eye pain in 69% of the cases analyzed. Migraine was the leading cause of eye pain in patients who visited neurology clinics.

Medical care for eye pain should be sought as soon as possible, especially if pain is accompanied by vomiting, blurred vision, bulging eyeballs, feelings of pressure, signs of injury or infection, or being unable to move one's eyes normally. The treatment of eye pain is highly dependent upon the underlying cause; however, common remedies include over-the-counter or prescription eye drops to relieve dryness or irritation. Prescription eye drops may contain antibiotics, antifungals or antivirals to treat or prevent infection, or NSAIDs, corticosteroids, or local anesthetics to relieve pain. For eye pain caused by an eye injury, a protective shield may be used to cover the injured eye; severe cases may require eye surgery.

== See also ==
- Eye strain
