= Cytostasis =

Inhibition of cell growth and proliferation

Cytostasis (cyto – cell; stasis – stoppage) refers to the inhibition of cell proliferation (cell growth and cell division). A cytostatic agent is a cellular component or drug that prevents cells from dividing, thereby suppressing proliferation; in some contexts, prolonged cytostasis may lead to cell death.

Cytostasis is essential for the development and maintenance of structured multicellular organisms. Without regulation of cell growth and division, organized tissues and organs would not be possible. Cytostatic drugs are widely used in the chemotherapy of cancer, as well as in the treatment of certain skin diseases and infections, although they may also affect normal, healthy cells and tissues. Certain active hygienic products also contain cytostatic substances.

In practice, cytostatic and cytotoxic mechanisms often occur together, as many agents display both growth-inhibitory and cell-killing effects depending on concentration, exposure time, and cell type. Unlike cytotoxicity, which kills cells, cytostasis suppresses proliferation without necessarily killing cells.

== Cytostatic agents ==
Nitric oxide – activated macrophages produce large amounts of nitric oxide (NO), which induces both cytostasis and cytotoxicity to tumor cells both in vitro and in vivo. Nitric oxide-induced cytostasis targets ribonucleotide reductase by rapid and reversible inhibition. However, other studies show there could be other targets that are responsible for producing long-lasting cytostasis in cells.

Lipopolysaccharide (LPS) and lipid A-associated protein – studies have demonstrated that LPS and LAP are potent macrophage activators that have been shown to stimulate tumoricidal (cytostatic) activity in vitro. LAP and LPS were shown to stimulate C3H/HeJ macrophages to kill target tumor cells. It was concluded that LAP can deliver at least one of the triggering signals necessary for inducing macrophage activity that leads to cytostasis.

Polyunsaturated fatty acid – N-3 and n-6 polyunsaturated fatty acids were found to have a distinct effect on cell growth in certain human urothelial cells. Cystostatic concentrations of n-3 and n-6 PUFA did not induce apoptosis, but did cause permanent cellular growth arrest by affecting the cell cycle. Study shows that metabolites of the lipoxygenase pathway are involved with the antiproliferation induced by PUFA. However, PUFA cytostatic activity is not tumor-specific.

== Cytostatic therapy ==
Cytostatic agents have been beneficial in fighting tumors with their ability to arrest cell growth. After administration, they are expelled from the body through urine and feces, which ultimately reach wastewater systems, posing a risk to the aquatic ecosystem. The risks have not been widely studied and more research is needed in this area.

== See also ==
- Chemotherapy
