= Limbal nodule =

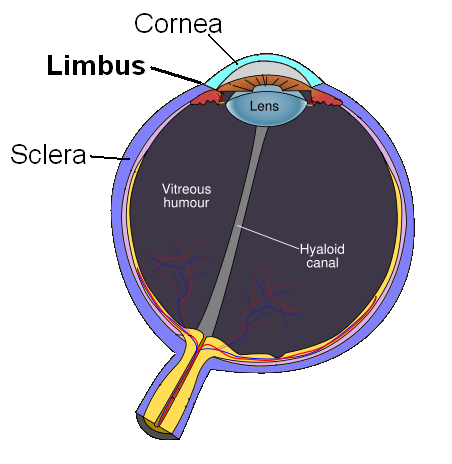
- Limbus
- Specialty: Ophthalmology

A limbal nodule is any nodular lesion at the limbus (junction of the cornea and sclera) of the eye.

The differential diagnosis for a limbal nodule can include:

- Pinguecula
- Early Pterygium
- Foreign body / foreign body granuloma
- Phlycten, an inflamed nodule of lymphoid tissue
- Episcleritis
- Scleritis
- Granuloma
- Limbal dermoid, a kind of choristoma (NB: in other organs dermoid can refer to a teratoma)
- malignant melanoma
- naevus

A 1989 case series of 636 limbal nodules examined over a period of 40 years at the Institute of Ophthalmology in London reported that 351 nodules involved malanocytes with two-thirds being benign nevi. Seventy three lesions were squamous cell carcinomas, and 137 premalignant lesions. Ten percent of the lesions were dermoid nodules.
