= Pseudopterygium =

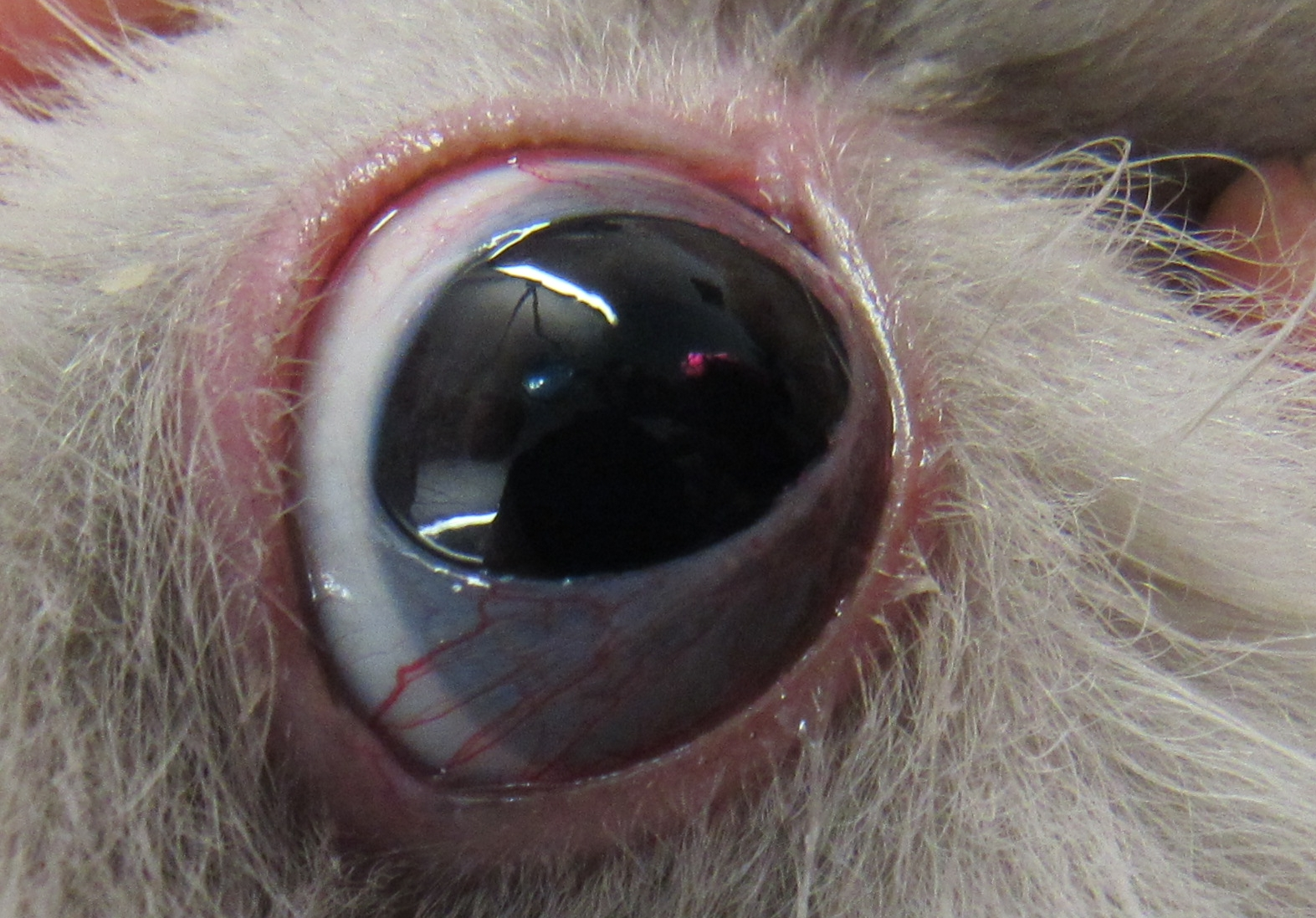
- Pseudopterygium in a rabbit
- Specialty: Ophthalmology
- Causes: Post inflammatory
- Diagnostic method: Eye examination
- Differential diagnosis: Pterygium
- Treatment: Surgery

Pseudopterygium is the conjunctival adhesion to cornea caused by limbal or corneal inflammation or trauma. The pseudopterygium can be easily distinguished from pterygium by bowman's probe test. Because of the lack of adherence of pseudopterygium at every point, the probe can be passed beneath it at some point.

== Causes ==
- Chemical burn
- Marginal corneal ulcer
- Cicatrizing conjunctivitis
- Trauma
- Surgery

== Differential diagnosis ==
Difference between pterygium and pseudopterygium
	Pterygium	Pseudopterygium
Etiology	Degenerative process	Inflammatory process
Age	Common in adults	Occur in any age
Site	Horizontally, most commonly nasally	Anywhere
Status	Progressive(commonly) or stationary	Always stationary
Neck	Adherent to limbus	Free
Probe test	Probe cannot be passed underneath	Probe can be passed under neck

== Treatment ==
Pseudopterygium can be removed by surgical excision.

== See also ==
- Symblepharon
- Pterygium
