= Pterygium =

Winglike triangular membrane

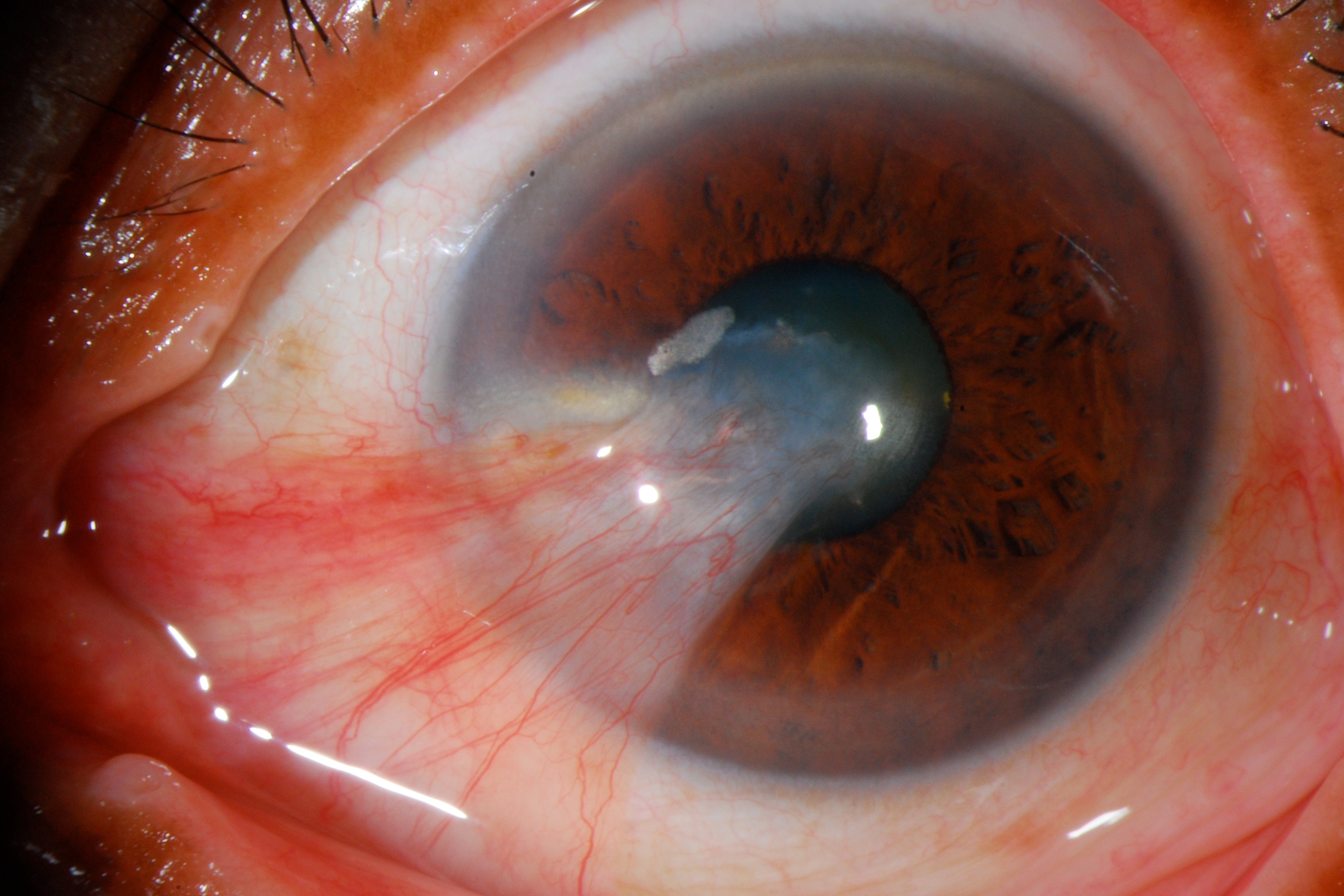
Pterygium of the eye

A pterygium (pl.: pterygia or pterygiums) is any wing-like triangular membrane occurring in the neck, eyes, knees, elbows, ankles or digits.

The term comes from the Greek word pterygion meaning "wing".

== Types ==
- Popliteal pterygium syndrome, a congenital condition affecting the face, limbs, or genitalia but named after the wing-like structural anomaly behind the knee.
- Pterygium (eye) or surfer's eye, a growth on the cornea of the eye.
- Pterygium colli or webbed neck, a congenital skin fold of the neck down to the shoulders.
- Pterygium inversum unguis or ventral pterygium, adherence of the distal portion of the nailbed to the ventral surface of the nail plate.
- Pterygium unguis or dorsal pterygium, scarring between the proximal nail fold and matrix.

== Pterygium of the eye ==
A pterygium reduces vision in several ways:

1. Distortion of the corneal optics. This begins usually when the pterygium is greater than 2mm from the corneal limbus.
2. Disruption of the tear. The tear film is the first lens in the eye. Pterygia are associated with eyelid inflammation, called blepharitis.
3. Growth over the corneal centre, which leads to dramatic reduction of vision.
4. Induced anterior corneal scarring, which often remains after surgical removal.

A pterygium of the eye grows very slowly. Usually it takes several years or decades to progress.

=== Surgical removal ===
Indications for surgery, in order of decreasing importance:

1. Growth over the corneal centre.
2. Reduced vision due to corneal distortion.
3. Documented growth.
4. Symptoms of discomfort.
5. Cosmesis.

Surgery is usually performed under local anaesthetic with light sedation as day surgery. The pterygium is stripped carefully off the surface of the eye. If this is all that is done, the pterygium regrows frequently. The technique with the lowest recurrence rate uses an autotransplantation of conjunctiva from under the eyelid. This is placed over the defect remaining from the removed pterygium. The graft can be stitched in place, which is time-consuming, and painful for the patient afterwards.

An alternative is the use of tissue adhesive fibrin glue. A Cochrane review including 14 studies and last updated October 2016, found that using fibrin glue when doing conjunctival autografting was associated with a reduced likelihood of the pterygium recurring compared with sutures. The review found that operations may take less time but fibrin glue may be associated with more complications (for example, rupture, shrinking, inflammation, granuloma). A 3-year clinical study on the application of collagen matrix as excision site grafts showed significantly improved surgery success rates.

The mechanism of the collagen matrix graft (commercially available as ologen) works by promoting healthy cell growth into the matrix, thus preventing conjunctiva overgrowth that can cover the iris.
