= Living related conjunctival limbal allograft =

Corneal transplant technique

Living-related conjunctival limbal allograft (lr-CLAL) is a type of ocular surface stem cell transplantation (OSST) that treats limbal stem cell deficiency (LSCD). lr-CLAL has been shown to stabilize the ocular surface by providing both limbal and conjunctival stem cells where prior KLAL(keratolimbal allograft) has failed.

== Pre-op ==
There are a few things to consider before following through with the procedure.

=== Immunosuppression ===
Systemic immunosuppression is necessary for long-term allograft survival, therefore, recipients must be suitable candidates for systemic immunosuppression. Immunosuppression plays a key role in minimizing rejection of grafted tissue.

=== Ocular surface injury ===
For injuries involving chemical burns, the ocular surface must stabilize before lr-CLAL may be performed.

=== Donor selection ===
The correct selection of the stem cell donor is a crucial part of making sure the transplant is successful. By making sure the donor and recipient are compatible, rejection rates can be minimized. The Cincinnati Donor Selection Protocol is the currently the most detailed protocol for confirming potential lr-CLAL donors. The compatibility of donor and recipient depends on ABO-typing, HLA typing, and donor specific antibody testing.

== Procedure ==
The procedure begins with harvesting tissue from the donors conjunctiva and limbus. The next step is to prepare the recipient eye, the abnormal corneal epithelium is then removed from the recipients eye. The harvested donor cells are then sutured onto the edge of the recipients limbus. Both the donor and recipient should be fitted with bandage contact lenses after their procedure to protect the cornea.

== Post-op ==
The patient is given systemic immunosuppressant medications to reduce transplant rejection. Acute rejection is the most common postoperative complication. This happens when the recipients immune system sees the transplant cells as foreign bodies and attacks them.

Acute rejections are treated with an increase in topical and systemic corticosteroids. Chronic rejections are treated with increased systemic immunosuppressive medications.

== See also ==
- Corneal transplantation
