= Chiesi Farmaceutici =

Italian pharmaceutical company

- Type: Società per Azioni, (S.p.A.)
- Industry: Pharmaceuticals
- Founded: 1935
- Headquarters: Parma, Italy
- Key people: Alberto Chiesi (President); Paolo Chiesi (Vice-president); David Khougazian (CEO)
- Products: Flogoprofen (Spain); Flogopatch (Spain); Laevolac
- Revenue: €3 billion (2023)
- Number of employees: 6500
- Subsidiaries: Arax Co., Ltd. (Japan)
- Website: www.chiesi.com

Chiesi Farmaceutici S.p.A. is an Italian family controlled global pharmaceutical company based in Parma, Emilia-Romagna. Chiesi has 31 affiliates in the world, nearly 7,200 total employees and provides medicines to patients in 100 nations. Chiesi currently has revenues of 3,4 billion euros. According to 2020 official data from the European Patent Office (EPO), Chiesi Group, with 42 patents filed, is confirmed as the first Italian Pharmaceutical Company and third among Italian Companies across all sectors for filing the highest number of patents.

In June 2019, Chiesi became a certified B Corporation, thus choosing to adopt a new legal status under US and Italian law. This ensures Chiesi legal protection to pursue a business model placing social and environmental values on equal footing with profits.

Following the acquisition, in 1999, of Huddersfield based Trinity Pharmaceuticals, Chiesi has also had a significant presence in Manchester, United Kingdom.

== History ==
Established in 1935, Chiesi concentrates primarily on developing respiratory, neonatological and rare disease drugs, along with those for treating muscular and skeletal conditions.

Historical therapeutic solutions are a cortisone preparation indicated for asthma, allergic rhinitis and airway inflammation, launched in 1979, and a surfactant life-saving treatment for premature babies, developed by two researchers at Karolinska Institutet, Tore Curstedt and Bengt Robertson.

In the rare disease area, a treatment for moderate to severe limbal stem cell deficiency (LSCD), developed by the researchers Michele De Luca and Graziella Pellegrini, was the first stem cell therapy to be approved in Europe. As well as developing drugs in-house, Chiesi has a policy of developing drugs in collaboration with pharmaceutical businesses outside Italy.

Chiesi's operations regarding neonatological drugs have come under criticism for patenting drugs that Chiesi has not been instrumental in developing. Because of this behavior, some of Europe's neonatology wards have experienced economic hardships.

The company holds over 4,000 international patents for more than 200 patent families and employs approximately 944 people dedicated to Research and Development activities, including regulatory in the R&D centers in Parma (Italy), France, United Kingdom, Sweden, USA, Canada and China.

2010 was the year in which turnover broke through the Billion Euro barrier, with Chiesi recording sales growth of 16.4% over the figure for 2009. By 2013 turnover had reached €1,236, with increases coming primarily from outside the Italian home market. Chiesi Farmaceutici closes 2016 on a high with an annual turnover of €1.571 million, an increase of more than +7.0% on the previous year (+9.6% at constant exchange rates), and EBITDA equal to €448 million (a year-on-year increase of over 8.2%). The robust health of the company is reflected by its investment in innovation and development, with R&D expenditure rising by over +12.5% in the 2015–2016 period to reach €370 m in 2019, 19% of total sales. The Group currently has 49 active studies in research and development. In 2020 the Chiesi Group reached and exceeded a turnover of 2 billion Euro.

In 2022, the Group recorded a turnover of €2 billion 749 million, an increase of 13.6% compared to 2021. Gross Operating Profit (EBITDA) grew by 7%.

In 2023, the Group recorded a turnover of €3 billion, an increase of 10% compared to 2022. Gross Operating Profit (EBITDA) grew by 30%

In 2022, Chiesi celebrated the start of construction of the new “Biotech Center of Excellence”, located next to the Group’s current Italian production site in Parma. The new R&D and production hub will be operational in 2024, thanks to an investment of 85 million euros, which will allow Chiesi to consolidate its know-how in the field of biotechnology products. The new Centre will embrace the whole end-to-end supply chain, with the first products expected to enter the market in 2025. In line with Chiesi's commitment as a B Corp, the Centre will be built sustainably and in compliance with LEED criteria.

== Therapeutic areas ==
Chiesi Farmaceutici researches and develops therapeutic solutions for respiratory diseases such as Asthma and COPD (Chronic Obstructive Pulmonary Disease), both characterized by a reduction in the respiratory flow but driven by a different pathophysiological pathway. New drugs are based on a technology which allows the creation of spray solutions for the inhalation of extra fine particles.

The company also has its focus on preterm babies’ care, specifically regarding the treatment of Respiratory Distress Syndrome (RDS) and apnea conditions, both due to an under-development of the respiratory system. Natural surfactant administered via intra-tracheal route treats RDS, and may also be used for the prophylaxis in neonates at high risk of developing the disease. For the more severe apnoea episodes, stimulant drugs are needed, such as caffeine-based treatments.

Chiesi Farmaceutici is developing new therapeutic solutions in the area of rare and ultra-rare diseases. For limbal stem cell deficiency (LSCD), a rare eye condition that may lead to blindness, a stem cell treatment has been developed and is marketed in Europe. In 2018, Chiesi achieved European marketing authorization for velmanase alfa, a first-in-class enzyme replacement therapy for alfa-mannosidosis, an ultra-rare condition. Chiesi is also present in nephropathic cystinosis and is developing a new product in Fabry disease.
