= Pterygium (eye) =

Triangular tissue growth on the cornea

- Other names: Surfer's eye
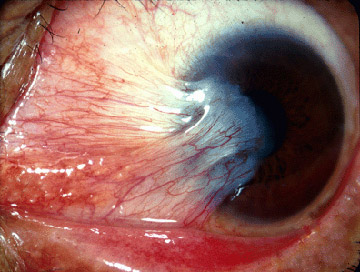
- Pterygium growing onto the cornea
- Specialty: Ophthalmology, Optometry
- Symptoms: Pinkish, triangular tissue growth on the cornea
- Complications: Vision loss
- Usual onset: Gradual
- Causes: Unknown
- Risk factors: UV light, dust, genetics
- Differential diagnosis: Pinguecula, tumor, Terrien's marginal degeneration
- Prevention: Sunglasses, hat
- Treatment: None, eye lubricant, surgery
- Prognosis: Benign
- Frequency: 1% to 33%

A pterygium of the eye (pl.: pterygia or pterygiums, also called surfer's eye) is a pinkish, roughly triangular tissue growth of the conjunctiva onto the cornea of the eye. It typically starts on the cornea near the nose. It may slowly grow but rarely grows so large that it covers the pupil and impairs vision. Often both eyes are involved.

The cause is unclear. It appears to be partly related to long term exposure to UV light and dust. Genetic factors also appear to be involved. It is a benign growth. Other conditions that can look similar include a pinguecula, tumor, or Terrien's marginal corneal degeneration.

Prevention may include wearing sunglasses and a hat if in an area with strong sunlight. Among those with the condition, an eye lubricant can help with symptoms. Surgical removal is typically only recommended if the ability to see is affected. Following surgery a pterygium may recur in around half of cases.

The frequency of the condition varies from 1% to 33% in various regions of the world. It occurs more commonly among males than females and in people who live closer to the equator. The condition becomes more common with age. The condition has been described since at least 1000 BC.

== Signs and symptoms ==
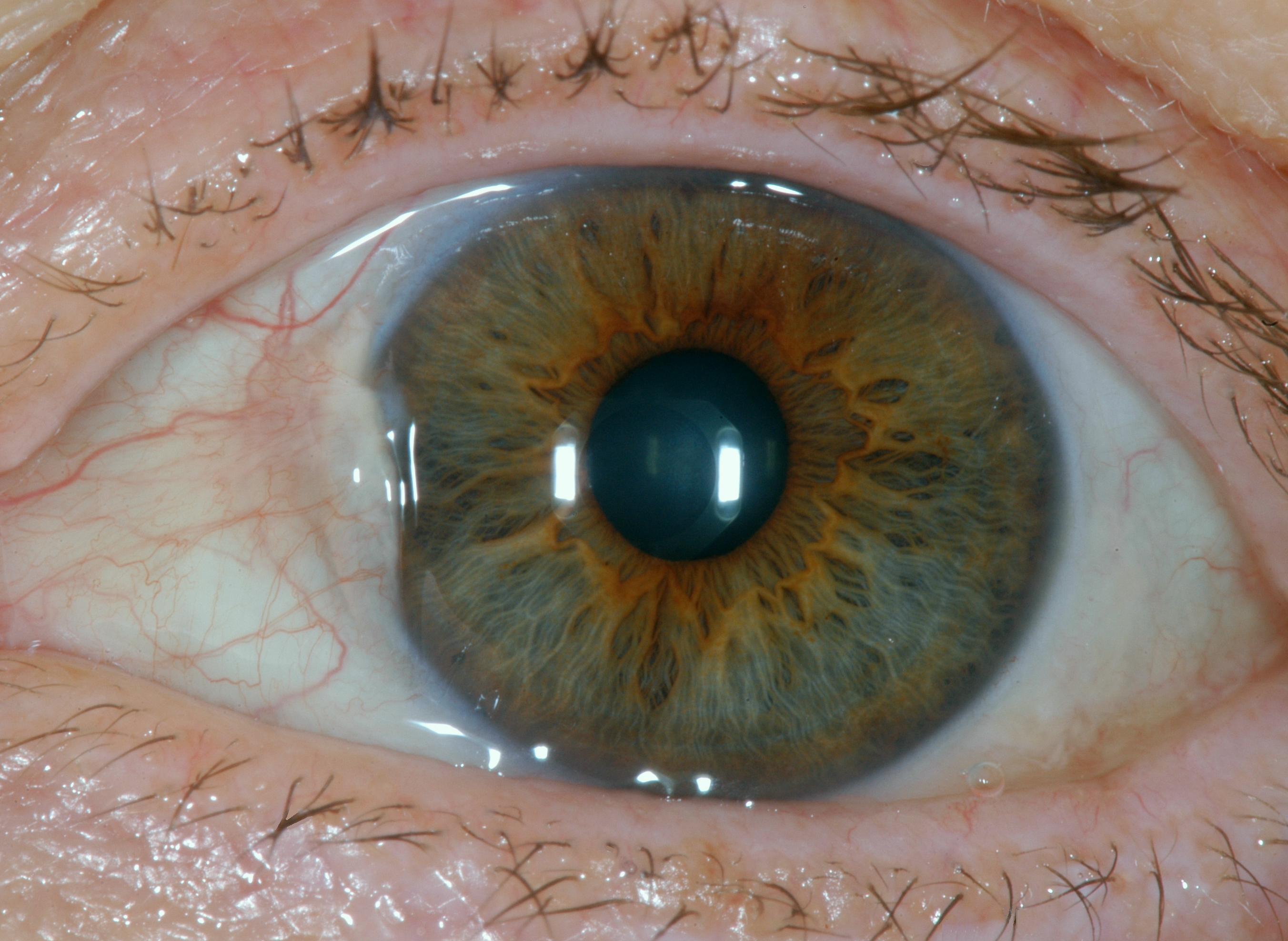
Small pterygium

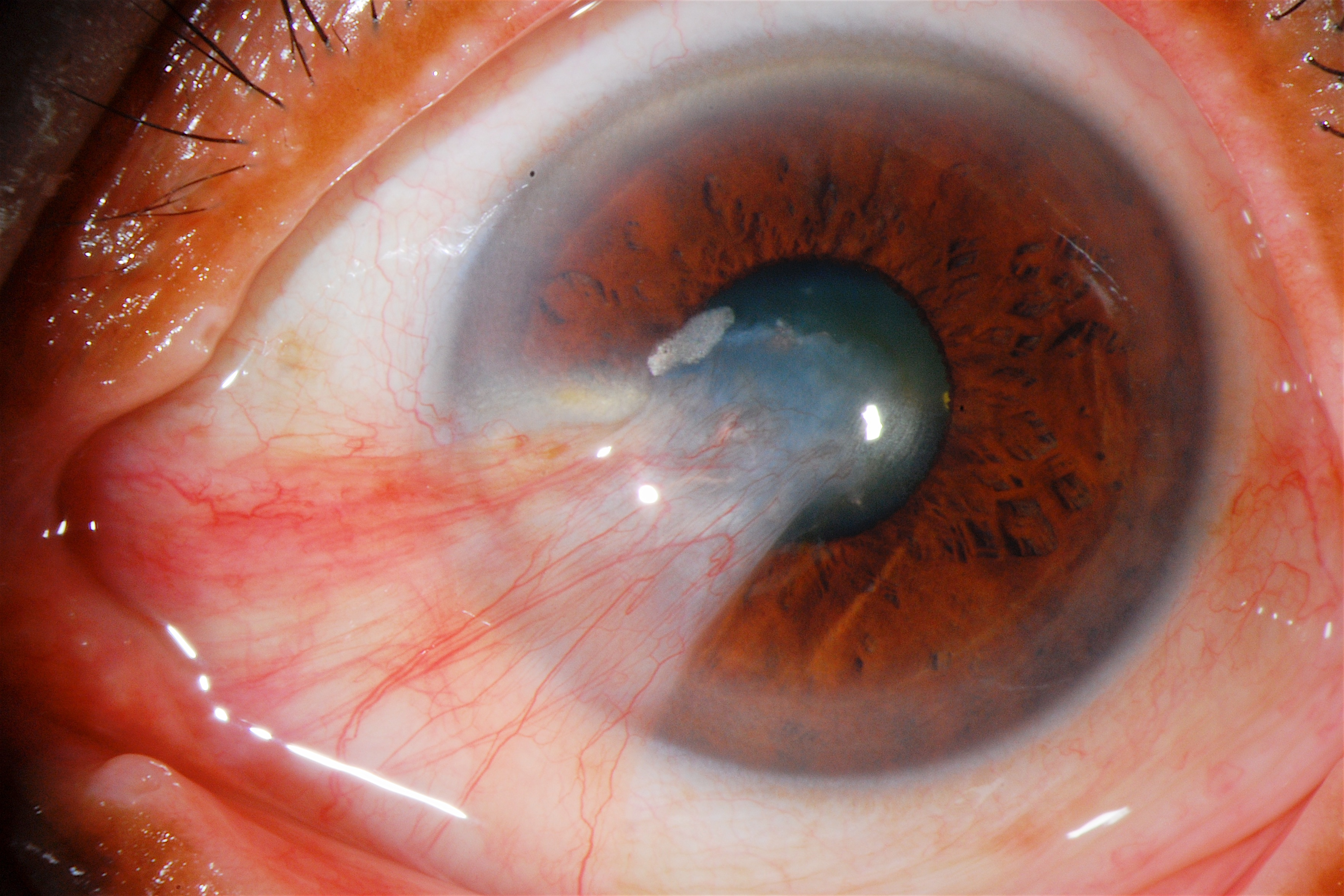
Large primary pterygium invading the pupil (visual axis)

Symptoms of pterygium include persistent redness, inflammation, foreign body sensation, tearing, dry and itchy eyes. In advanced cases the pterygium can affect vision as it invades the cornea with the potential of obscuring the optical center of the cornea and inducing astigmatism and corneal scarring. Many patients do complain of the cosmetic appearance of the eye either with some of the symptoms above or as their major complaint. The use of standard contact lenses can become uncomfortable or even impossible although custom shaping may improve the fit to some extent.

== Cause ==
The exact cause is unknown, but it is associated with excessive exposure to wind, sunlight, or sand. Therefore, it is more likely to occur in populations that inhabit the areas near the equator, as well as windy locations. In addition, pterygia are twice as likely to occur in men than women.

== Pathology ==
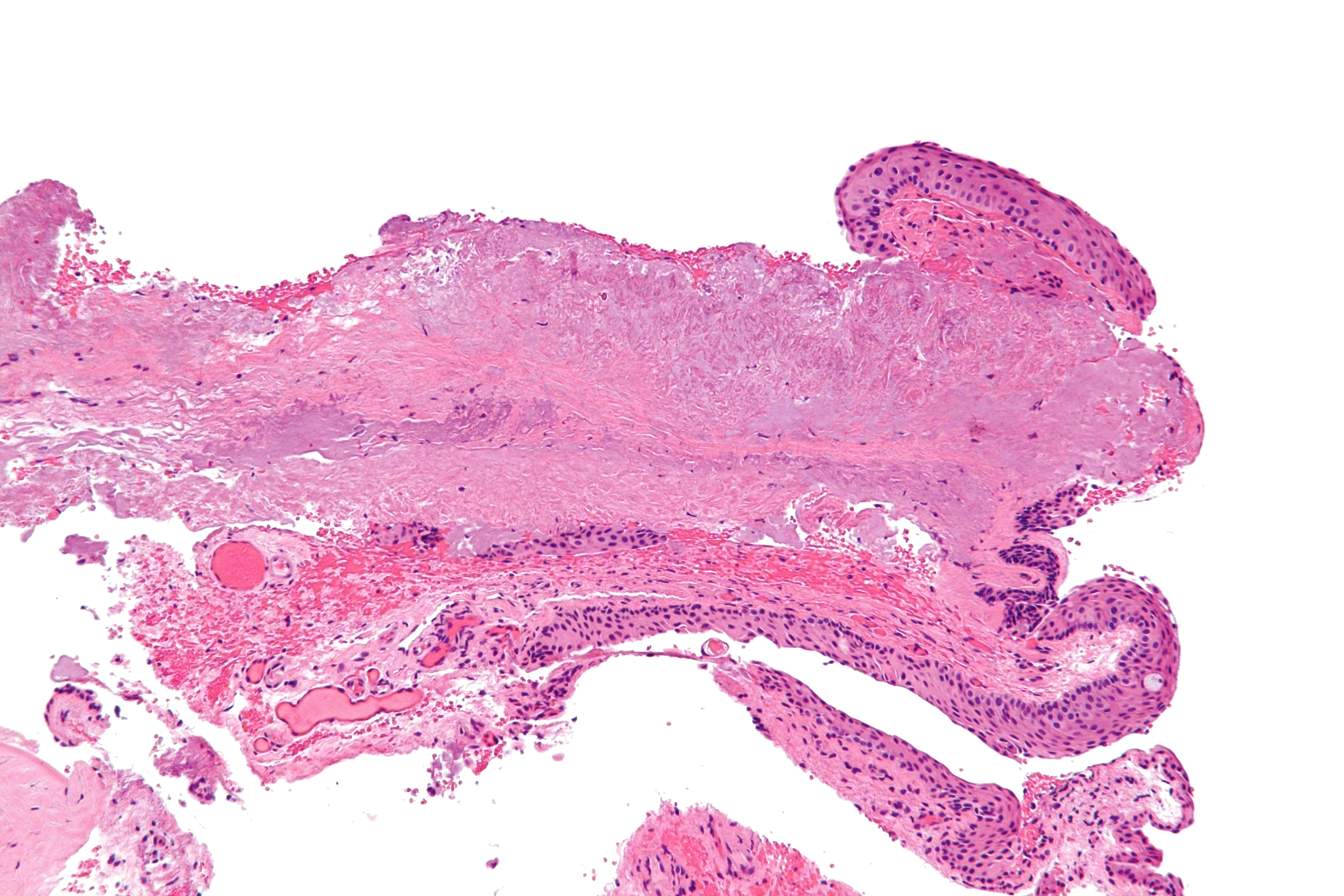
Micrograph of a conjunctiva associated with prominent blood vessels (left-bottom of image) and elastotic collagen (centre of image), as may be seen in a pterygium. H&E stain.

Pterygium in the conjunctiva is characterized by elastotic degeneration of collagen (actinic elastosis) and fibrovascular proliferation. It has an advancing portion called the head of the pterygium, which is connected to the main body of the pterygium by the neck. Sometimes a line of iron deposition can be seen adjacent to the head of the pterygium called Stocker's line. The location of the line can give an indication of the pattern of growth.

The predominance of pterygia on the nasal side is possibly a result of peripheral light focusing, where the sun's rays passing laterally through the cornea, where they undergo refraction and become focused on the limbic area. Sunlight passes unobstructed from the lateral side of the eye, focusing on the medial limbus after passing through the cornea. On the contralateral (medial) side, however, the shadow of the nose medially reduces the intensity of sunlight focused on the lateral/temporal limbus.

Some research also suggests a genetic predisposition due to an expression of vimentin, which indicates cellular migration by the keratoblasts embryological development, which are the cells that give rise to the layers of the cornea. Supporting this fact is the congenital pterygium, in which pterygium is seen in infants. These cells also exhibit an increased P53 expression likely due to a deficit in the tumor suppressor gene. These indications give the impression of a migrating limbus because the cellular origin of the pterygium is actually initiated by the limbal epithelium.

The pterygium is composed of several segments:

- Fuchs' Patches (minute gray blemishes that disperse near the pterygium head)
- Stocker's Line (a brownish line composed of iron deposits)
- Hood (fibrous nonvascular portion of the pterygium)
- Head (apex of the pterygium, typically raised and highly vascular)
- Body (fleshy elevated portion congested with tortuous vessels)
- Superior Edge (upper edge of the triangular or wing-shaped portion of the pterygium)
- Inferior Edge (lower edge of the triangular or wing-shaped portion of the pterygium).

== Diagnosis ==
Pterygium (conjunctiva) can be diagnosed without need for a specific exam, however corneal topography is a practical test (technique) as the condition worsens.

=== Differential Diagnosis ===
Pterygium should be differentiated from pinguecula, which is histologically and etiologically similar to pterygium. Unlike pterygium, pinguecula is seen only on the conjunctiva, it will not progress to limbus or cornea.

Another condition which is similar to pterygium is inflammatory adhesion of conjunctiva to cornea known as pseudopterygium. Unlike pterygium, it may occur anywhere around cornea and the adhesion is usually limited to its apex.

== Prevention ==
As it is associated with excessive sun or wind exposure, wearing protective sunglasses with side shields and/or wide brimmed hats and using artificial tears throughout the day may help prevent their formation or stop further growth. Surfers and other water-sport athletes should wear eye protection that blocks 100% of the UV rays from the water, as is often used by snow-sport athletes. Many of those who are at greatest risk of pterygium from work or play sun exposure do not understand the importance of protection.

== Treatment ==
A pterygium typically does not require surgery unless it grows to such an extent that it causes visual problems. Some of the symptoms such as irritation can be addressed with artificial tears. Surgery may also be considered for unmanageable symptoms.

=== Surgery ===
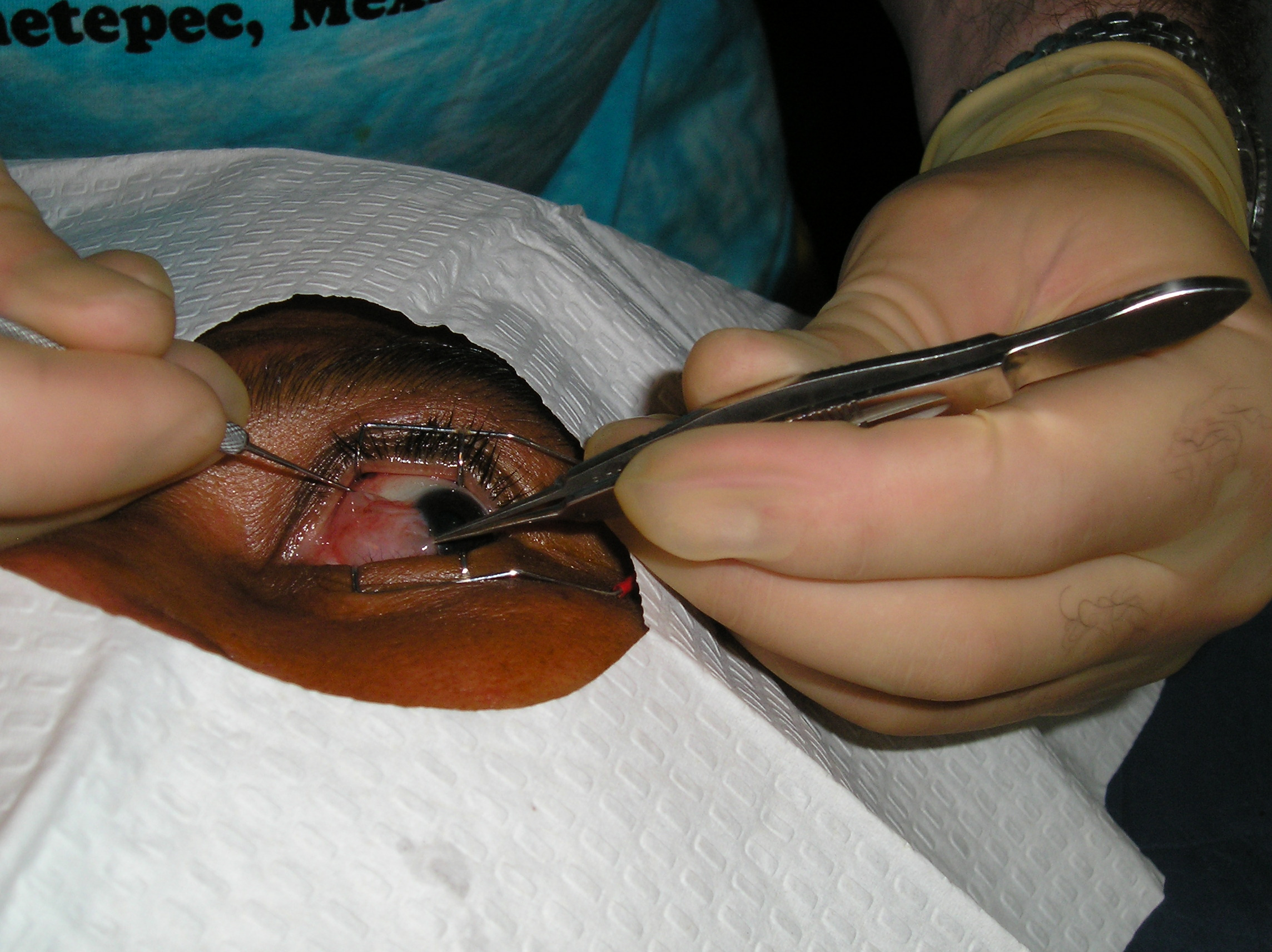
Pterygium removal surgery

A Cochrane review found conjunctival autograft surgery was less likely to have reoccurrence of the pterygium at 6 months compared to amniotic membrane transplant. More research is needed to determine which type of surgery resulted in better vision or quality of life. The additional use of mitomycin C is of unclear effect. Radiotherapy has also been used in an attempt to reduce the risk of recurrence.

==== Auto-grafting ====
Conjunctival auto-grafting is a surgical technique that is an effective and safe procedure for pterygium removal. When the pterygium is removed, the tissue that covers the sclera known as the Tenons layer is also removed. Auto-grafting covers the bare sclera with conjunctival tissue that is surgically removed from an area of healthy conjunctiva. That "self-tissue" is then transplanted to the bare sclera and is attached using sutures or tissue adhesive.

==== Amniotic membrane transplantation ====
Amniotic membrane transplantation is an effective and safe procedure for pterygium removal. Amniotic membrane transplantation offers practical alternative to conjunctival auto graft transplantation for extensive pterygium removal. Amniotic membrane transplantation is tissue that is acquired from the innermost layer of the human placenta and has been used to replace and heal damaged mucosal surfaces including successful reconstruction of the ocular surface. It has been used as a surgical material since the 1940s, and has been shown to have a strong anti-adhesive effect.

Using an amniotic graft facilitates epithelialization, and has anti-inflammatory as well as surface rejuvenation properties. Amniotic membrane transplantation can also be attached to the sclera using sutures, or glue adhesive. Amniotic membrane by itself does not provide an acceptable recurrence rate.
