= Pinguecula =

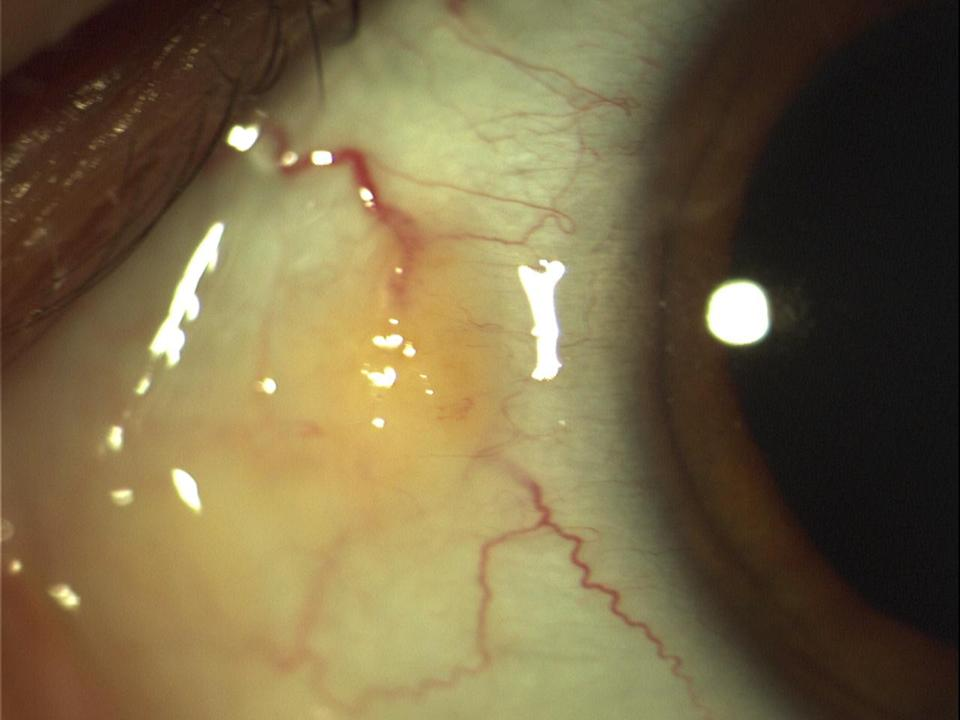
- Specialty: Ophthalmology

A pinguecula is a common type of conjunctival stromal degeneration in the eye. It appears as an elevated yellow-white plaque in the bulbar conjunctiva near the limbus. Calcification may also be seen occasionally.

== Signs and symptoms ==
It is seen as a yellow-white deposit on the conjunctiva adjacent to the limbus (the junction between the cornea and sclera). (It is to be distinguished clinically from a pterygium, which is a wedge shaped area of fibrosis that may grow onto the cornea.) A pinguecula usually does not cause any symptoms. It is most common in tropical climates and there is a direct correlation with UV exposure.

Histologically, there is degeneration of the collagen fibers of the conjunctival stroma with thinning of the overlying epithelium and occasionally calcification. Actinic exposure of the thin conjunctival tissue is thought to cause fibroblasts to produce more elastin fibers, which are more twisted than normal elastin fibers and may lead to the degradation of the collagen fibers. Alternatively, it has been postulated that the sub-epithelial collagen fibers undergo degradation and assume the qualities of elastic tissue while fragmenting and twisting in a different configuration from their normal state.

It is thought that the high reflectivity of the solid white scleral tissue underlying the conjunctival tissue may result in additional UV exposure to the back side of the tissue. The side of the nose also reflects sunlight on to the conjunctiva. As a result, pingueculae tend to occur more often on the nasal side of the eye. While most pingueculae are found in people over the age of 40, they are not uncommon in 20- and 30-year-old adults who spend significant time in the sun.

The surface of the conjunctival tissue overlying a pinguecula interferes with the normal spreading of the tear film. The tear ferning test reveals abnormalities of the mucous component of the tear film, making it useful as a predictor of a person's tolerance of hydrophilic soft contact lenses. Contact lens intolerance can also result from the elevation of the peripheral edge of the contact lens if it overlies a pinguecula.

The plural form of pinguecula is pingueculae. Pinguecula is derived from the Latin word "pinguis" for fat or grease.

=== Associated conditions ===
A pinguecula is one of the differential diagnoses for a limbal nodule. It may have an increased prevalence in Gaucher's disease.

== Etiology ==
The exact etiology is unknown, but it may be associated with aging and excessive exposure to UV light.

== Diagnosis ==
Diagnosis of pinguecula is usually done by an eye care professional during routine eye examination using slit lamp. Conjunctival biopsy may be advised if malignancy is suspected.

== Treatment ==
Pingueculae may enlarge slowly over time, but it is a benign condition, usually requiring no treatment. Artificial tears may help to relieve discomfort, if it occurs. If cosmesis is a concern, or if there is discomfort in contact lens use, surgical excision may be done. Occasionally, a pinguecula may become inflamed, a condition called pingueculitis. The cause of pingueculitis is unknown and there are no known infectious agents associated with it. If an inflamed pinguecula is causing discomfort or cosmetic concerns, it may be treated with short course of topical steroid. Laser photocoagulation may also be used to remove pinguecula.

== See also ==
- Peripheral light focusing
- Pterygium (conjunctiva)
