= Peripheral light focusing =

Eye science

Peripheral Light Focusing (PLF) can be described as the focusing of Solar Ultraviolet Radiation (SUVR) at the nasal limbus of the cornea. SUVR incident at the temporal limbus passes across the corneal dome and focuses at the nasal limbus. The limbal region is a stem cell rich tissue. Ocular conditions such as pinguecula and pterygium may occur due to the result of this increased exposure to SUVR in limal area, but it is not the only cause of pterygium formation.
