= Pterygium inversum unguis =

- Other names: Pterygium inversus unguis, and Ventral pterygium
- Specialty: Dermatology

Pterygium inversum unguis or ventral pterygium is characterized by the adherence of the distal portion of the nailbed to the ventral surface of the nail plate. The condition may be present at birth or acquired, and may cause pain with manipulation of small objects, typing, and close manicuring of the nail. It is a secondary to connective tissue disorders. Pterygium inversum unguis is often asymptomatic.

== Signs and symptoms ==
Pterygium inversum unguis is often asymptomatic. The most commonly reported symptom amongst those who do experience symptoms is bleeding or pain after clipping the affected nails.

== Causes ==
The cause of pterygium inversum unguis is unknown. Congenital pterygium inversum unguis is assumed to be brought on by an early abnormality in the fetal ridge and groove formation. Idiopathic forms of pterygium inversum unguis may result from the nail bed's distal expansion, which often aids in the creation of the nail plate. Secondary pterygium inversum unguis is thought to be caused by abnormal distal circulation.

== Diagnosis ==
A prominent hyperkeratotic stratum corneum with normal nail bed vasculature is seen upon histological analysis. It extends and is firmly linked to the underside of the nail plate.

== Treatment ==
The best way to address pterygium inversum unguis is unclear; many approaches, such as topical steroids, keratolytics, and electrocautery-assisted surgical excision, have been shown to be ineffective. Treating the underlying cause of pterygium inversum unguis is the best course of action.

== Epidemiology ==
As of 2014, only 37 cases have been reported in literature. Pterygium inversum unguis most commonly affects women ages 20-70.

== See also ==
- Pterygium unguis
- Nail
- List of cutaneous conditions
