= Terrien's marginal degeneration =

- Specialty: Ophthalmology

Terrien marginal degeneration is a noninflammatory, unilateral or asymmetrically bilateral, slowly progressive thinning of the peripheral corneal stroma.

== Cause ==
The cause of Terrien marginal degeneration is unknown, its prevalence is roughly equal between males and females, and it usually occurs in the second or third decade of life.

== Treatments ==
Spectacles or RGP contact lenses can be used to manage the astigmatism. When the condition worsens, surgical correction may be required.
