= Pterygium unguis =

- Other names: Dorsal pterygium
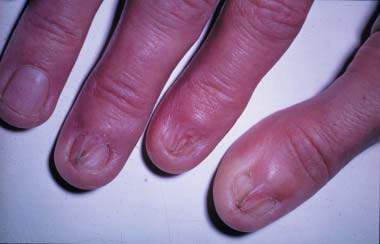
- Specialty: Dermatology
- Causes: Lichen planus

Pterygium unguis (or dorsal pterygium) forms as a result of scarring between the proximal nailfold and matrix, with the classic example being lichen planus, though it has been reported to occur as a result of sarcoidosis and Hansen's disease.

== See also ==
- List of cutaneous conditions
- Pterygium inversum unguis
