= Limbal stem cell =

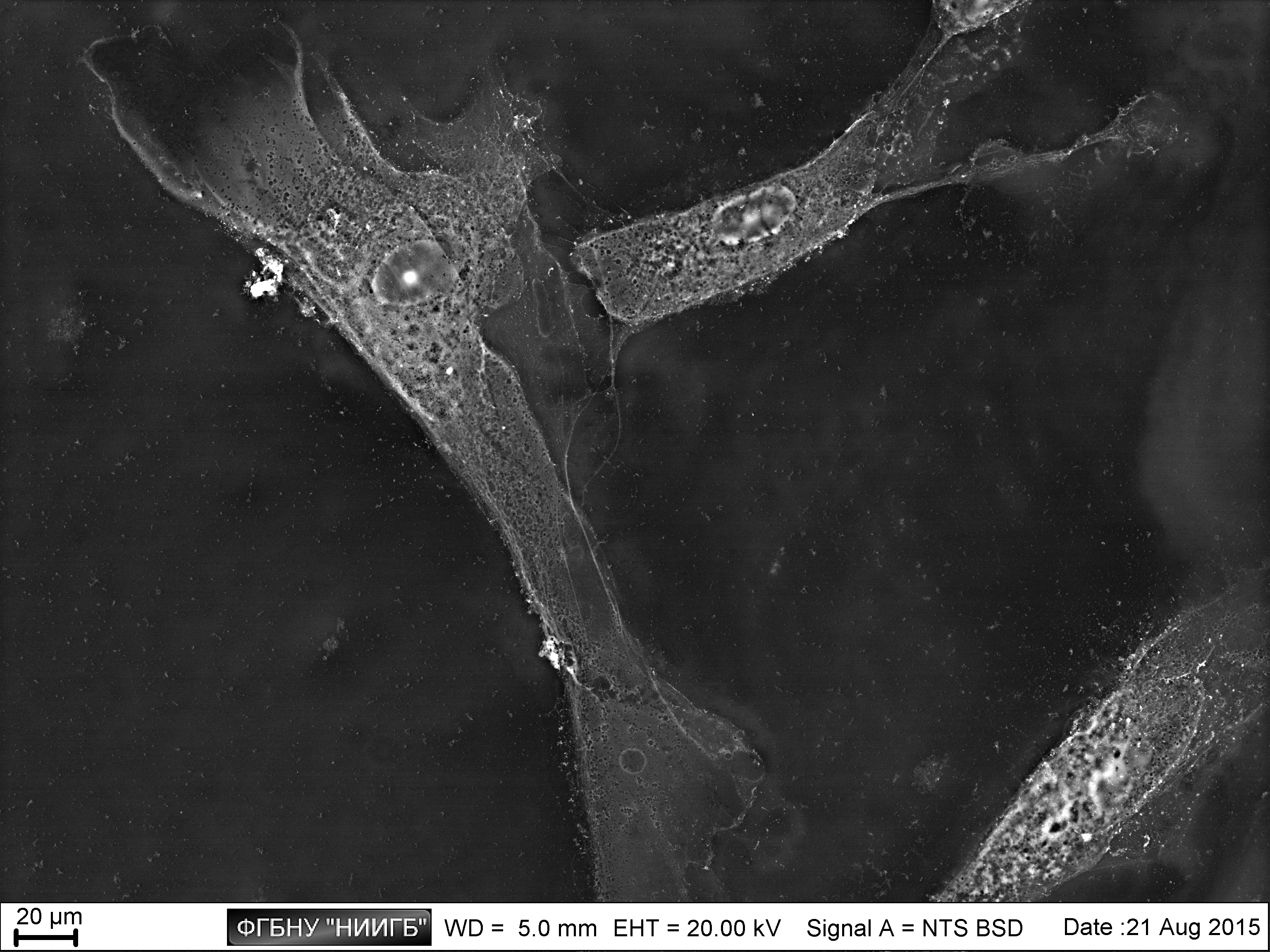

Clinical data
- Trade names: Holoclar
- Other names: ex vivo expanded autologous human corneal epithelial cells containing stem cells
- AHFS/Drugs.com: UK Drug Information
- ATC code: S01XA19 (WHO)

Legal status
- Legal status: EU: Rx-only

Limbal stem cells, also known as corneal epithelial stem cells, are unipotent stem cells located in the basal epithelial layer of the corneal limbus. They form the border between the cornea and the sclera. Characteristics of limbal stem cells include a slow turnover rate, high proliferative potential, clonogenicity, expression of stem cell markers, as well as the ability to regenerate the entire corneal epithelium. Limbal stem cell proliferation has the role of maintaining the cornea; for example, by replacing cells that are lost via tears. Additionally, these cells also prevent the conjunctival epithelial cells from migrating onto the surface of the cornea.

== Medical conditions and treatments ==
Damage to the limbus can lead to limbal stem cell deficiency (LSCD); this may be primary - related to an insufficient stromal microenvironment to support stem cell functions, such as aniridia, and other congenital conditions, or secondary – caused by external factors that destroy the limbal stem cells, such as chemical or thermal burns, radiation, surgery, infection, use of contact lenses, or certain drugs.

Signs and symptoms include: conjunctivalisation, corneal vascularisation, ocular discomfort or pain, visual impairment, photophobia, and blindness, which are likely associated with failure in the process of regenerating the corneal epithelium.

Immediate management aims to limit traumatic or chemical damage to the limbus, control inflammation, and help achieve a healthy corneal epithelium. Initial treatment after trauma/injury includes preservative-free artificial tears, topical steroids, 'bandage' contact lenses, and autologous eye drops (eye drops manufactured from the patient's own blood serum and plasma). Once the corneal surface has stabilized, surgery is the main approach to treatment.

Types of surgeries:

1. In the case of a partial LSCD:, a sequential sector conjunctival epitheliectomy (SSCE) can be performed to remove any tissue (pannus) that has grown over the cornea. This procedure is sometimes used as a temporary measure until further surgical interventions are possible.
2. Transplantation of amniotic membrane from a placenta may also help. Although amniotic membrane does not have stem cells of its own, it supports regeneration of limbal stem cells. However, further surgical intervention may be needed if these approaches are unsuccessful, or when disease is more severe.
3. Conjunctival limbal autograft (CLAU) involves transplantation of limbal tissue from a patient's healthy eye. As the procedure is achieved by transplanting autologous limbal stem cells from the patient's healthy eye, there is no risk of immune rejection, and hence no need for systemic immunosuppression. However, this procedure represents a risk for the donor eye, as the patient already has one eye damaged.
4. In the case of bilateral LSCD, where both eyes are affected, it may be possible to transplant limbal tissue from a living donor (usually a relative). This is known as a conjunctival limbal allograft (CLAL). CLAL can be performed with both partial or total LSCD, the donor tissue is usually from a sibling or parent. As with CLAU, only a part of the donor limbus can be transplanted, as a live donor is being used. Being an allogenic transplant, immunosuppression is required, due to the risk of rejection.
5. Kerato-limbal allograft (KLAL) involves transplantation from someone who has died and donated their organs. KLAL can be used for cases of bilateral LSCD when a living related donor is not available, or for patients with unilateral LSCD, who don't want to jeopardise their healthy eye. However, most of these types of transplant fail within five years. KLAL has a number of limitations: the graft is usually up to 24 hours old before retrieval and a further period of time is often required to screen the cadaver's blood before the tissue can be used; often the limbus is found to be damaged as the tissue is not immunocompatible, there is a high risk of rejection between the recipient and the donor cadaver and studies report only a temporary success in term of transplant effectiveness, with most failing after 5 years.
6. A recent procedure, less invasive than CLAU, which so far has been tested only in unilateral cases, is simple limbal epithelial transplantation (SLET). In this procedure, healthy limbal tissue from the patient's good eye is cut into a number of pieces and transferred directly to human amniotic membrane covering the cornea in the damaged eye. Studies published so far have only investigated the procedure in unilaterally affected patients, and the long-term effectiveness of the technique is yet to be proven.
7. Another recent innovation is cultivated limbal epithelial transplant (CLET), either autologous (where donor and recipient are the same patient) or allogenic (where donor and recipient are different patients). This approach can be used when either one or both eyes are affected, providing there is sufficient limbal tissue available (1–2 mm^{2}). A small sample of limbal cells is taken from a healthy part of the eye, and grown in a sterile laboratory to produce a sheet of cells sufficient for transplantation. Once transplanted, they multiply and regrow the corneal epithelium. The manufacturing process is designed to ensure implantation of the right number, size and quality of cells. CLET avoids some of the issues faced by other limbal transplantation procedures and does not pose a threat to the integrity of the donor eye. It also offers the possibility of re-grafting in case of failure of the first graft or need for a further graft. Autologous CLET has been developed to specifically treat LSCD in a recent phase I clinical trial.

== Types ==
There are three types of clonogenic keratinocytes involved in the generation of the corneal epithelium: holoclones, meroclones and paraclones. 1- Holoclones: as true stem cells, have the greatest growth potential, and give rise to 2-meroclones, which have a much lower proliferative capacity, but frequently divide. 3- Paraclones have even lower proliferative capacity. Both meroclones and paraclones are known as transient amplifying cells and their purpose is to form a stratified squamous epithelium. All three types of keratinocytes are present in the basal layer of the limbus, with holoclones in the least abundance (10%–15%). The basal layer of the cornea is populated by meroclones and paraclones at the periphery, and only paraclones in the central cornea, reflecting the above process of cell division and differentiation. Holoclones are identified by high expression of the marker p63 and are also known as p63 bright cells.

== Society and culture ==
In February 2015, the European Commission approved autologous CLET using the stem cell therapy Holoclar for people with severe LSCD due to corneal burns. This is the first time that a stem cell therapy (other than the use of umbilical cord stem cells) has been approved by any regulatory agency in the world. It was created by Graziella Pellegrini and Michele de Luca. Holoclar is a tissue-engineered product that comprises ex vivo expanded autologous human corneal epithelial cells including stem cells, which replace limbal stem cells in patients where the limbus has been destroyed by ocular burns. The use of p63 transcription factor as a biomarker of potency ensures specified amount of stem cells needed for clinical success. Clinically relevant long-term beneficial results have been documented in the treatment of patients with LSCD due to physical or chemical ocular burns.

== See also ==
- List of human cell types derived from the germ layers

== Figures ==
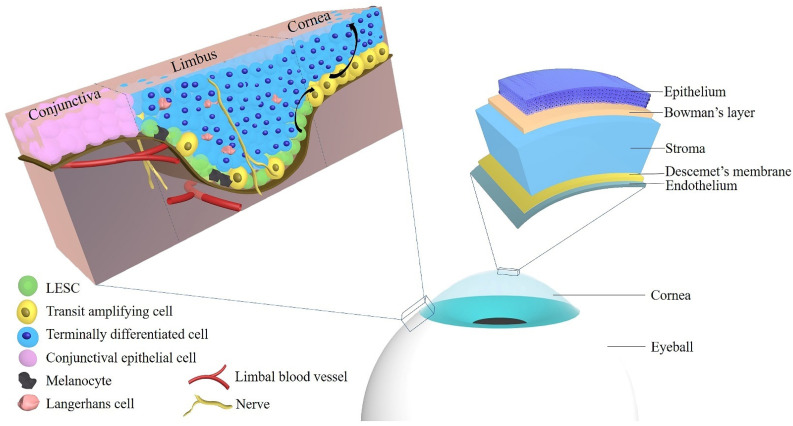
The localization of limbal epithelial stem cells and the anatomy of the cornea. LESC: limbal epithelial stem cell.From a review by Ruan et al., 2021.
