= Corneal limbus =

Border between the cornea and the sclera of the eye

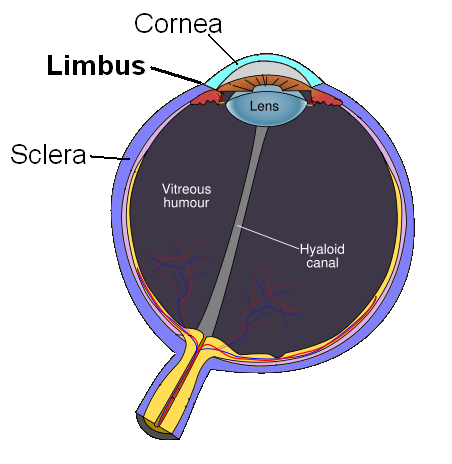
- Schematic diagram of the human eye

Details

Identifiers
- Latin: limbus corneae
- MeSH: D016850
- TA98: A15.2.02.014
- TA2: 6748
- FMA: 58342

The corneal limbus (Latin: corneal border) is a highly vascularized and pigmented zone between the cornea, conjunctiva, and the sclera (the white of the eye) that protects and heals the cornea. The cornea is composed of three primary cell types: epithelial cells, corneal fibroblasts, and endothelial cells. The corneal surface is one of the body's most specialized structures that undergoes continuous cellular renewal and regeneration. It contains limbal epithelial stem cells (LESCs) in the palisades of Vogt. Limbal stem cell deficiency (LSCD) can lead to disorders where limbal stem cells are damaged or absent. Additional disorders involving the corneal limbus are caused by deficiencies in interactions between ocular structures, developmental anomalies, and cancer.

This article explores the structure, functions, disorders, and clinical significance of the corneal limbus.

== Etymology ==
The word "limbus" comes from the Latin meaning "border."

== Structure ==
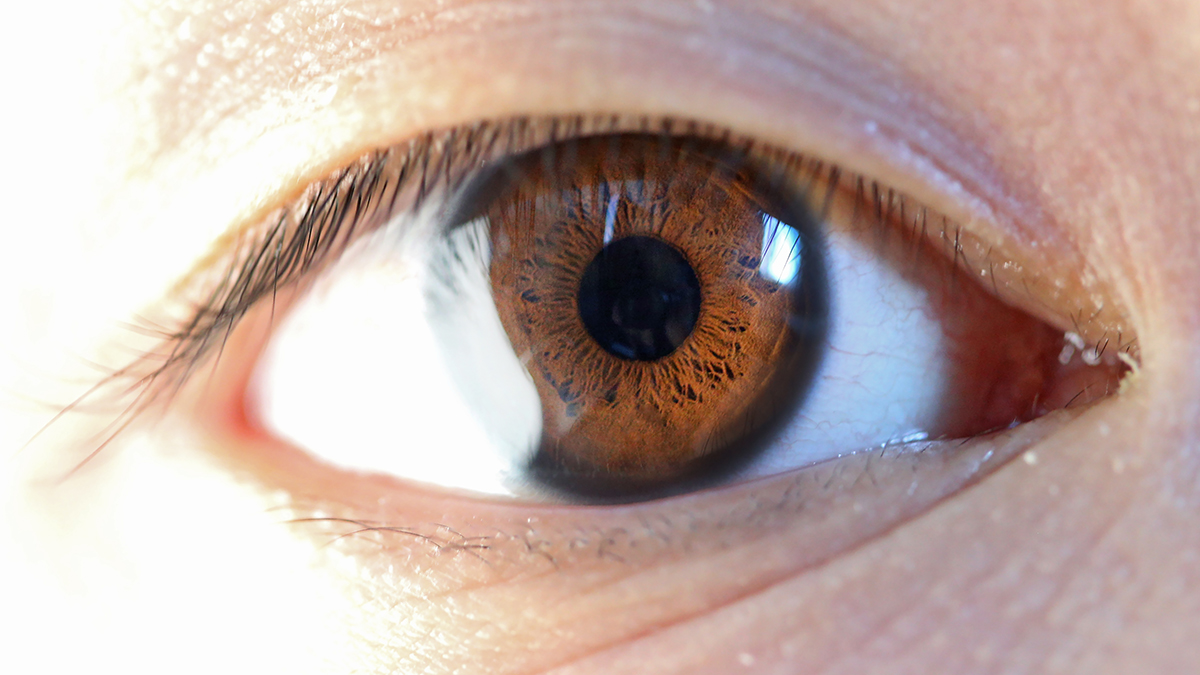
The corneal limbus manifests as a dark ring around the iris. Its prominence varies by individual

The corneal limbus is the border between the cornea and the sclera. It is highly vascularized. The corneal limbus aids in protection, healing, and controlling eye pressure. The limbus contains corneal stem cells that play key roles in corneal healing (renewing the corneal epithelium). Its stratified squamous epithelium is continuous with the epithelium covering the cornea.

The cornea is transparent and possesses an elliptic/oval shape. The thickness of the cornea varies based on position, with greater thickness maintained within the peripheral regions than the center region. The corneal limbus also contains vessels that aid in the transport of nutrients and cytokines, making the peripheral cornea more susceptible to immune-mediated inflammation than the center. The cornea refracts incoming light to ensure focusing of light onto the retina, is covered by a tear film (anterior), and borders the aqueous filled chamber (posterior).

=== Palisades of Vogt ===
The corneal limbus contains radially-oriented fibrovascular ridges known as the palisades of Vogt, containing limbal stem cells. The palisades of Vogt are more common in the superior and inferior quadrants around the eye. The palisades of Vogt were first described by a clinician in 1914, however they were first dubbed “palisades” by Alfred Vogt in 1921.

This region of the corneal limbus is unique to each individual, spanning ten to fifteen cells in the epithelium of the interpalisade and around two or three cells in thickness. The visibility of the palisades of Vogt depend on the pigmentation and age of an individual, and those with more melanin will have more pigmented palisades of Vogt. The palisades of Vogt contain a high quantity of hairpin vessels. The basal cells of the palisades of Vogt are strongly attached to a basement membrane and highly vascularized.

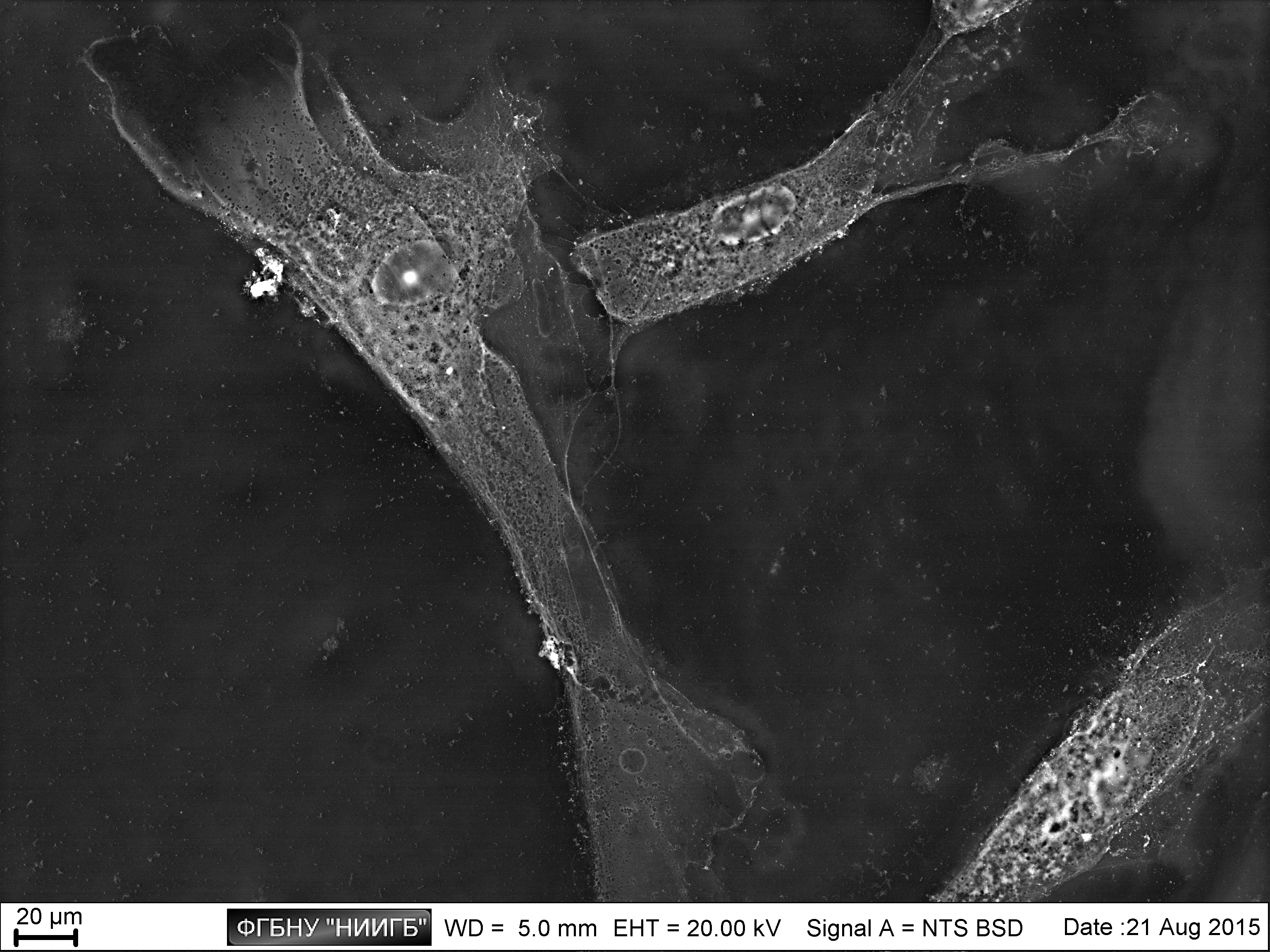
Limbal epithelium

=== Limbal Epithelial Stem Cells (LESCs) ===
Epithelial stem cells on the ocular surface are vital for preserving corneal transparency, which is essential for clear vision, where it allows light to pass through and reach the retina. In humans, a subset of the basal cells functions as limbal epithelial stem cells (LESCs), which are responsible for the continuous regeneration of the central corneal epithelium. Self-renewing tissues depend on populations of stem cells and progenitor cells to continuously regenerate and maintain themselves throughout life, settling for routine cellular turnover and damage caused by injury. It is known that the limbus contains a population of unipotent LESCs. These cells are believed to be essential in sustaining the corneal epithelium under normal homeostatic conditions and during tissue repair following injury. During homeostasis, LESCs are slow-cycling and retain DNA labels for extended periods. However, in response to injury, they can shift to a highly proliferative state. To restore the stem cell pool, these cells possess the capacity for asymmetric division.

A specialized anatomical microenvironment, known as the niche, controls the proliferative capacity and differentiation potential of LESCs and their progeny. The LESC niche is believed to reside within the Palisades of Vogt (PV). The limbal niche is characterized by high vascularization and innervation and provides nutrients and growth factors that support LESC function and maintenance.

Partial or complete LESC deficiency impairs corneal wound healing. This deficiency can result from injuries such as chemical or thermal burns, as well as diseases like aniridia. LESC deficiency may lead to conjunctivalization, chronic inflammation, recurrent erosions, ulceration, and stromal scarring, causing painful vision loss. The long-term restoration of visual function depends on the regeneration of the corneal epithelium that happens through transplantation of limbal autografts or allografts to replace the stem cell population. These procedures carry potential damage to the healthy donor eye. As an alternative, cultured LESC therapy has been developed, where LESCs are expanded in vitro and applied therapeutically using various protocols involving amniotic membrane. More recently, research has shown that alternative stem cell sources, including human embryonic stem cells and hair follicle stem cells, can be induced to differentiate into corneal epithelial-like cells, offering potential therapy.

== Functions ==
The limbus has often been referred to as a niche for limbal epithelial stem cells (LESCs). The blood vessels of the palisades of Vogt may provide cytokines and nutrients to limbal cells. Compared to the corneal basement membrane, the limbal basement membrane contains elevated levels of laminin and different types of collagen. This may contribute to its role in differentiation and formation of the limbal niche, as well as in diminishing the damage stem cells may receive from motion or injury through adherence.

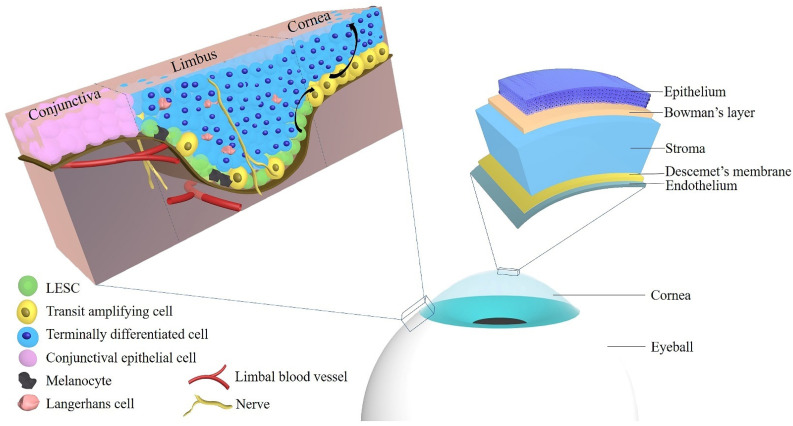
The localization of limbal epithelial stem cells and the anatomy of the cornea.

LESCs divide asymmetrically to produce corneal epithelial progenitors, or transient amplifying cells (TACs). This process is involved in the maintenance of the corneal epithelium. Additionally, the limbus shows elevated LESC division and turnover rate following corneal injury.

The cornea, a transparent structure covering the anterior chamber of the eye, plays a role in transmitting and focusing light onto the retina while also protecting the eye's internal components. Maintaining its function relies on the proper operation of its three cellular layers, the epithelium, stroma, and endothelium, each contributing to its overall integrity and optical performance.

== Disorders ==
Some disorders associated with the corneal limbus arise due to limbal stem cell deficiency (LSCD). Additional disorders involving the corneal limbus are caused by deficiencies in interactions between ocular structures, developmental anomalies, and cancer.

=== Conjunctivalization ===
When limbal stem cells are damaged, a transformation of corneal epithelium tissue occurs. During this process, the cornea becomes covered by the conjunctival epithelium. The presence of goblet cells and neovascularization of the cornea are signs of this process. This can lead to chronic inflammation, epithelial defects and potential opacification of the cornea. Symptoms may include itching, burning, conjunctival redness, and decreased visions abilities. Management includes surgical tarsorrhaphy, punctal occlusion, moisture treatments, or application of ointments or non-preservative artificial tears.

=== Superior Limbic Keratoconjunctivitis (SLK) ===
More commonly diagnosed in females, SLK Is thought to be caused by deficiencies in the interaction between the superior eyelid and the superior bulbar conjunctiva. SLK can also be influenced by tear deficiency. The presence of punctate epithelial erosions on the cornea, limbus, and bulbar conjunctiva are signs of SLK. Symptoms of SLK may include burning sensations, foreign body sensations, and photophobia. Management includes using topical steroids, termination of wearing contact lenses (in contact lens-related SLK), and if treatment fails, removal of the superior bulbar conjunctiva or conjunctival resection.

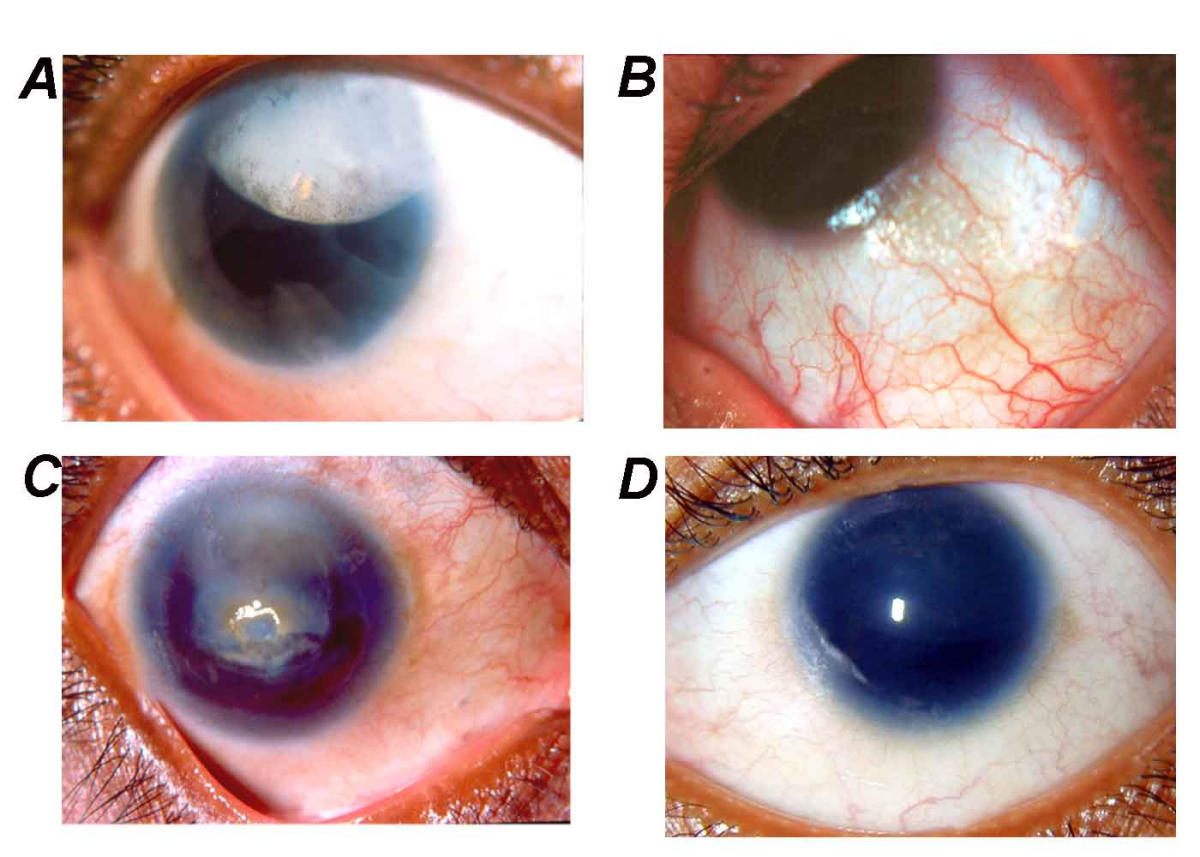
Aniridia of the human eyeball, PAX6 mutation

=== Aniridia ===
Aniridia is a genetic disorder resulting from a mutation in the PAX6 gene that leads to the absence of the iris at birth. It disrupts the microenvironment of limbal stem cells. Aniridia impacts vision in both eyes, making it a bilateral condition. The pupil of individuals affected by Aniridia will appear large and unevenly shaped. Symptoms may include eye pain, blurry vision, loss of vision or blindness in one or both eyes, and photophobia. Management includes specialized glasses, contact lenses, medication, and surgery.

=== Squamous Conjunctival Neoplasia (SCN) ===
More commonly diagnosed in males, the corneal limbus is a common site for the occurrence of Squamous Conjunctival Neoplasia (SCN), a cancer that is typically found at limbus and between the eyelids. The average age of patients affected by SCN is 56 years old. The presence of an opaque white or yellow tumor on the surface of the eye are signs of SCN. Treatment includes surgery (although reoccurrence of the tumor is common), cryotherapy (local freezing of the tumor sclera and adjacent conjunctiva), and radiation.

== Clinical significance ==
The corneal limbus can also play a significant role in the treatment of ocular diseases such as Glaucoma.

=== Glaucoma treatment ===
The corneal limbus may be cut to allow for aqueous humor to drain from the anterior chamber of the eye into the subconjunctival space. This can be used in glaucoma treatment. The hole created only needs to be small, although slightly bigger than needed to account for gradual healing. This procedure sometimes fails, particularly if the hole is large. It can lead to eye irritation from blebbing.

Trabeculectomy, a surgery used to treat glaucoma, is best performed with an incision through the superior part of the corneal limbus. Mattress suturing may be used to close this incision.
